= Zenkaikon =

Multi-genre convention in Lancaster, Pennsylvania

Coordinates: 40°2′15″N 76°18′17″W

- Status: Active
- Genre: Multi-genre including Anime, Manga, Science Fiction, and popular culture
- Venue: Lancaster County Convention Center; Holiday Inn Lancaster
- Location: Lancaster, Pennsylvania
- Country: United States
- Inaugurated: 2006
- Attendance: 5,364 in 2018
- Organizer: Zenkaikon Entertainment, Inc.
- Filing status: 501(c)(3)
- Website: http://www.zenkaikon.com/

Zenkaikon is a multi-genre convention held during March at the Lancaster County Convention Center and Holiday Inn Lancaster in Lancaster, Pennsylvania. The convention was formerly based around King of Prussia, Pennsylvania (a Philadelphia suburb). Zenkaikon's name is a portmanteau of Zentrancon (science-fiction convention) and Kosaikon (anime convention), created when they merged in 2006. The convention has an all-volunteer staff.

== Programming ==
The convention typically offers anime and live action screenings, AMVs, artist alley, concerts, cosplay masquerade, costume competitions, dances, dealers room, formal costume ball, game shows, iron cosplay, karaoke, LARP, live bands, maid cafe, manga library, panels, swap meet, tabletop gaming, vendors, video gaming, and workshops.

In 2015, the charity auction benefited the Lymphoma Research Foundation and raised over $1,800. The foundation was chosen due to the death of guest CJ Henderson from Lymphoma. In 2017, the charity auction benefited Ocean Conservancy. In 2018, the charity auction benefited The AbleGamers Foundation. 2019's charity was the Arch Street Center. 2025's charity was the Lancaster Public Library.

== History ==
Zenkaikon was formed in 2006 by the merger of two Philadelphia-area events, Zentrancon and Kosaikon. In 2008, Zenkaikon became a two-day convention. In 2009 due to significant attendance growth, Zenkaikon moved to the larger Valley Forge Radisson Hotel (same complex as its former location the Scanticon) and capped attendance at 1,500 attendees per day. In 2010, Zenkaikon announced it would become a three-day convention, move to a spring date (skipping 2010), and increase convention space by using both the Valley Forge Convention Center and Scanticon Hotel and Conference Center (same complex). The changes were made to improve weather, allow for better preparation, and increase staff. During the convention in 2011, Zenkaikon and its attendees raised $3750 for the American Red Cross Japanese Earthquake and Pacific Tsunami Relief Fund. Due to construction of the Valley Forge Casino Resort at the Valley Forge Convention Center, Zenkaikon 2012 was held at a new location, The Greater Philadelphia Expo Center at Oaks, and reduced to two days.

Zenkaikon moved to the Lancaster County Convention Center for 2013 and returned to being a three-day event. The convention returned to the Lancaster County Convention Center in 2014 and occupied every (four) floor. Zenkaikon returned to the convention center in 2015, and 2016 for its 10th anniversary. In 2017, the convention used Tellus360's Temple Room for additional space. Zenkaikon 2020 was cancelled due to the COVID-19 pandemic. The convention held virtual programming on what was to be the Saturday of the event. Zenkaikon 2021 was also cancelled due to the COVID-19 pandemic, with an online event announced in its place. The convention's 2022 COVID-19 policies required masks and vaccination. Zenkaikon for the first time used both floors of Tellus360 for events.

Changes in 2023 included the convention printing no program booklet, the video game room being upgraded, and the addition of a cosplay repair room. The convention expanded to the Holiday Inn Lancaster in 2024 and moved the gaming programming there. A shuttle bus was provided to travel between the venues. Thursday evening programming was available to attendees who pre-registered. The Holiday Inn had to be evacuated on Saturday due to public disturbances occurring at the Lancaster Public Library. The convention continued to be split between the Lancaster County Convention Center and Holiday Inn in 2025, along with having Thursday programming. Artists Alley and the guest list were also expanded. In 2026 both venues continued to be utilized, and the convention continued to offer Thursday programming. Various improvements were made including the addition of more shuttles to allow for easier transit between the venues.

=== Event history ===
Dates	Location	Atten.	Guests
October 28, 2006	Valley Forge Scanticon Hotel and Conference Center; King of Prussia, Pennsylvania	450	Peter Fernandez, Corinne Orr, Prism, and Alex Strang.
October 13, 2007	Valley Forge Scanticon Hotel and Conference Center; King of Prussia, Pennsylvania	570	D-Chan, Hsu-nami, and Uncle Yo.
October 17–18, 2008	Valley Forge Scanticon Hotel and Conference Center; King of Prussia, Pennsylvania	1,429	Charles Batschelet, Jessi Bavolack, Michael Gans, CJ Henderson, Ikuzo! Studios, Michele Knotz, Matt Pascal, Raqs Attaq!, Laura Robinson, Will Robinson, Bill Rogers, The Slants, Rose Thompson, Ultraball, and Uncle Yo.
November 7–8, 2009	Radisson Valley Forge Hotel; King of Prussia, Pennsylvania	1,988	Robert Axelrod, Johnny Yong Bosch, Stephanie Celeste, C. J. Collins, Eden Star, Eyeshine, Geek Comedy Tour, Gerry Giovinco, CJ Henderson, Hi5, Chris Kalnick, Mike Leeke, Kevin McKeever, Reni Mimura, Trina Nishimura, Jessi Pascal, Matt Pascal, Rich Rankin, Laura Robinson, Will Robinson, Bill Spangler, Uncle Yo, Neil Vokes, Tommy Yune, and [geist].
March 18–20, 2011	Valley Forge Convention Center and Scanticon Hotel and Conference Center; King of Prussia, Pennsylvania	3,422	Kevin Bolk, Gelatine, Todd Haberkorn, James Harknell, Onezumi Hartstein, CJ Henderson, DJ Luminal, Sarah Martinez, Vic Mignogna, Rose Noire, Uncle Yo, and Greg Wicker.
May 11–12, 2012	Greater Philadelphia Expo Center at Oaks; Oaks, Pennsylvania	2,822	The Asterplace, Jillian Coglan, Samurai Dan Coglan, CJ Henderson, Hi5, Michele Knotz, DJ Kurono, KyoDaiko, Pennsylvania Jedi, Platform One, Sonny Strait, Uncle Yo, and Japan America Society of Greater Philadelphia.
March 22–24, 2013	Lancaster County Convention Center; Lancaster, Pennsylvania	3,376	T. Campbell, John de Lancie, Eien Strife, Richard Epcar, Phil Kahn, DJ Midget, The Slants, Ellyn Stern, and Greg Wicker.
April 25–27, 2014	Lancaster County Convention Center; Lancaster, Pennsylvania	4,422	Gina Biggs, Cosplay Burlesque, Jim Cummings, The Extraordinary Contraptions, CJ Henderson, Greg Houser, Kuniko Kanawa, Lolita Dark, Jonathan Maberry, Brina Palencia, Bill Rogers, Marc Swint, Trifecta, Uncle Yo, Doug Walker, and Greg Wicker.
March 27–29, 2015	Lancaster County Convention Center; Lancaster, Pennsylvania	5,079	Cosplay Burlesque, Richard Horvitz, Kuniko Kanawa, Lauren Landa, Matthew Mercer, Trina Nishimura, Kambrea Pratt, Thom Pratt, The Ricecookers, Rikki Simons, Uncle Yo, Doug Walker, Rob Walker, and Greg Wicker.
April 1–3, 2016	Lancaster County Convention Center; Lancaster, Pennsylvania	5,755	Dante Basco, Kevin Bolk, Cosplay Burlesque, Eien Strife, Richard Epcar, Sarah Martinez, Vic Mignogna, Ellyn Stern, Alex Strang, Uncle Yo, Greg Wicker, and Lex Winter.
April 28-30, 2017	Lancaster County Convention Center; Lancaster, Pennsylvania	5,569	Steve Blum, Cosplay Burlesque, Cosplay Pro-Wrestling, Keith R. A. DeCandido, Kuniko Kanawa, John Patrick Lowrie, Mary Elizabeth McGlynn, Ellen McLain, The Slants, Uncle Yo, Greg Wicker, and Lex Winter.
May 4-6, 2018	Lancaster County Convention Center; Lancaster, Pennsylvania	5,364	Jessica Calvello, Cosplay Burlesque, Quinton Flynn, Kiba, Phil LaMarr, Jonathan Maberry, Jad Saxton, The Triforce Quartet, Greg Wicker, Sarah Wiedenheft, and Lex Winter.
March 22-24, 2019	Lancaster County Convention Center; Lancaster, Pennsylvania		Cosplay Burlesque, Cosplay Pro-Wrestling, Michaela Dietz, Todd Haberkorn, Kiba, The Manly Battleships, Monica Rial, Samantha Sawyer, Austin Tindle, Lex Winter, and The X-Hunters.
March 19-21, 2021	Online convention		
March 25-27, 2022	Lancaster County Convention Center; Tellus360; Lancaster, Pennsylvania		Awesomus Prime, Beau Billingslea, Chalk Twins, Greg Cox, Debi Derryberry, The Manly Battleships, Uncle Yo, Kari Wahlgren, and Mick Wingert.
March 24-26, 2023	Lancaster County Convention Center; Lancaster, Pennsylvania		Chalk Twins, Keith R. A. DeCandido, Emi Lo, The Manly Battleships, Zeno Robinson, John Swasey, and Uncle Yo.
March 22-24, 2024	Lancaster County Convention Center; Holiday Inn Lancaster; Lancaster, Pennsylvania	About 5,500	Dani Chambers, Richard Epcar, The Manly Battleships, David Sobolov, Ellyn Stern, Super Art Fight, Kirk Thornton, Uncle Yo, Barracuda Cosplay, and Children Driving Robots.
March 20-23, 2025	Lancaster County Convention Center; Holiday Inn Lancaster; Lancaster, Pennsylvania		Awesomus Prime, Kira Buckland, SungWon Cho, Greg Cox, Lizzie Freeman, Michael Kovach, Lex Lang, The Manly Battleships, Casey Mongillo, Ashley Nichols, Natalie Rial, Jack Stansbury, Super Art Fight, Kari Wahlgren, Matthew Waterson, Holly Chou, Cadaver Dave, Children Driving Robots, and Mikal Mosley.
March 20-22, 2026	Lancaster County Convention Center; Holiday Inn Lancaster; Lancaster, Pennsylvania		Caitlin Glass, Hylian Cream, Phil LaMarr, Emi Lo, The Manly Battleships, Khary Payton, Lisa Reimold, Jeremy Shada, Megan Shipman, Josh Trujillo, Natalie Van Sistine, Lex Winter, Children Driving Robots, Drawfee, Hyper Potions, and Mikal Mosley.

== Kosaikon Anifest ==
Kosaikon was an anime convention held from 2003 to 2005 on the campus of Villanova University. The convention featured anime screenings, artists' alley, an artist's gallery, cosplay contest, and video gaming with tournaments.

=== Event history ===
Dates	Location	Atten.	Guests
May 31, 2003	Villanova University; Villanova, Pennsylvania	73	
February 21, 2004	Villanova University; Villanova, Pennsylvania	103	
October 9, 2004	Villanova University, Bartley Hall; Villanova, Pennsylvania	110	
March 26, 2005	Villanova University, Bartley Hall; Villanova, Pennsylvania	380	

== Zentrancon ==
Zentrancon was an anime and science fiction convention held on October 16, 2005 at The Rotunda, University of Pennsylvania. It was created by members of the Delaware Anime Society. The convention featured autograph sessions, costume contests, dealers, film screenings, raffles, tabletop gaming, and video game tournaments.

=== Event history ===
Dates	Location	Atten.	Guests
October 16, 2005	The Rotunda; Philadelphia, Pennsylvania	365	Eric Bresler, D-Chan, and Corinne Orr.

== Collaborations ==
Zenkaikon staff provided anime and Asian content to America's Video Games Expo 2008 (VGXPO) at the Pennsylvania Convention Center, in Philadelphia, Pennsylvania on November 21–23, 2008. Content included screenings, panels, gaming tournaments, and karaoke. Zenkaikon returned to VGXPO 2009 on October 9–11, 2009 and provided two screening rooms for anime. Zenkaikon hosted a Cosplay Fashion Show in Fairmount Park during Sakura Sunday at the 2012 Subaru Cherry Blossom Festival of Greater Philadelphia.
