= KotoriCon =

Anime convention held in New Jersey

Coordinates: 39.781118°N 75.121636°W

- Kotori, mascot of KotoriCon
- Status: Defunct
- Genre: Anime, Manga, Japanese pop culture, and Video games
- Venue: Rowan College at Gloucester County
- Location: Sewell, New Jersey
- Country: United States
- Inaugurated: 2010
- Attendance: 1,020 in 2018
- Organizer: RCGC Japanese Anime Guild
- Website: rcgc.edu/Kotoricon

KotoriCon was an annual two-day anime convention held during January at Rowan College at Gloucester County (formerly known as Gloucester County College) in Sewell, New Jersey. It was sponsored by the college's Japanese Anime Guild and KotoriCon's name came from the Japanese word for little bird, inspired by the colleges roadrunner mascot. The convention was designed to be family-friendly. The convention ran its final event in 2020.

== Programming ==
The convention typically offered anime music videos contest, artists' alley, charity auction, comedians, cosplay events, dealers' rooms, Jedi events, karaoke, live performances, martial arts demonstrations, panels, and video game tournaments.

== Charity ==
Proceeds from the 2011 convention went to the Doctors Without Borders and Child's Play charity. In 2012 the charity auction benefited Direct Relief International and the Lauren Rose Foundation. Proceeds from the convention in 2012 resulted in a $700 donation to Mothers Matters. Charities the 2013 convention benefited were Hurricane Sandy victims and Liberty in North Korea (LiNK). The 2014 charity auction benefited The AbleGamers Foundation, a North Korean human-rights group, and others. The 2015 charities that KotoriCon supported were Able Gamers, Doctors Without Borders, Liberty in North Korea, and Pets for Vets. 2017's charities included Child's Play, Doctors without Borders, Indochinese-American Council, KotoriCon Endowment, Liberty in North Korea, Pets for Vets, and Seabrook Buddhist Temple. KotoriCon's 2019 charities included the Cystic Fibrosis Foundation, Fisher House Foundation, KotoriCon Scholarship Endowment, Liberty in North Korea, Seabrook Buddhist Temple, and Samaritan's Purse.

== History ==
The convention in 2010 started under the name Gloucester County Anime Convention. Video gaming was held in the cafeteria on Friday night in 2011. The convention was spread out among three buildings on the Gloucester County College campus including the Fine Arts Center, College Center, and The Instructional Center. The third KotoriCon was in two locations, Pitman High School and Gloucester County College; in the first location, a concert by Eyeshine took place on January 6, 2012. The 2019 convention had a ticket limit of 1,500 attendees.

=== Event history ===
Dates	Location	Atten.	Guests
January 16, 2010	Gloucester County College; Sewell, New Jersey	250-350	Aikido Agatsu Dojo, Dr. Ross Beitzel, Chie Matsumura Dusk, geist, Jamie McGonnigal, Pennsylvania Jedi, Princeton Kendo and Iaido Club, Michael Shore, Katie Tom-Wolverton, and Peter Tom-Wolverton.
January 14–15, 2011	Gloucester County College; Sewell, New Jersey	505	Robert Axelrod, Cosplay Joe, Jonny "Jace" Davidson, Chie Matsumura Dusk, KyoDaiko, LeetStreet Boys, MaeMae, Reni Mimura, Pennsylvania Jedi, Promise Sisters, Katie Tom-Wolverton, Peter Tom-Wolverton, and Uncle Yo.
January 6–7, 2012	Pitman High School; Gloucester County College; Pitman, New Jersey; Sewell, New Jersey	1,000	+2 Comedy, The Asterplace, Johnny Yong Bosch, Daniel Coglan, Jillian Coglan, Elderberry, Eyeshine, Gavin Goszka, Ichigo Pantsu, Michele Knotz, DJ Kurono, KyoDaiko, Catherine Maiorino, Jamie McGonnigal, Mesquite Honey, Pennsylvania Jedi, Bill Rogers, Sneko, Uncle Yo, and Stuart Zagnit.
January 12, 2013	Gloucester County College; Sewell, New Jersey	1,000+ (est)	+2 Comedy, The Asterplace, Daniel Coglan, Jillian Coglan, CJ Henderson, Michele Knotz, Jamie McGonnigal, Scott A. Melzer, Pennsylvania Jedi, Platform One, Mike Pollock, Bill Rogers, Ian Rubin, Sneko, Uncle Yo, and Uzuhi.
January 11–12, 2014	Gloucester County College; Sewell, New Jersey	1,200	+2 Comedy, 501st Legion, The Asterplace, The Audio Pool, Daniel Coglan, Jillian Coglan, Gavin Goszka, CJ Henderson, The Hsu-nami, Michele Knotz, Jamie McGonnigal, Mega Ran, Scott A. Melzer, Bill Rogers, Ian Rubin, Sneko, Sonny Strait, Uncle Yo, and Uzuhi.
January 9–10, 2015	Rowan College at Gloucester County (formerly Gloucester County College); Sewell, New Jersey	1,500	Danielle Ackley-McPhail, The Asterplace, Greg Cipes, Charles Dunbar, Chuck Huber, Michele Knotz, KyoDaiko, Jamie McGonnigal, Scott A. Melzer, The Ricecookers, Ian Rubin, Sonny Strait, Uncle Yo, Lisle Wilkerson, K-Ble Jungle, Ciro Nieli, and Ted Williams.
January 8–9, 2016	Rowan College at Gloucester County; Sewell, New Jersey	1,374	The Asterplace, James Carter Cathcart, Daniel Coglan, Jillian Coglan, Mr. Creepy Pasta, Patrick Drazen, Charles Dunbar, Hoh Daiko Taiko, Kazha, Michele Knotz, Reuben Langdon, Jamie McGonnigal, Brandon Jay McLaren, "Trailer" Drake McWhorter, Scott A. Melzer, Daman Mills, Ian Rubin, Uncle Yo, and Greg Wicker.
January 6–7, 2017	Rowan College at Gloucester County; Sewell, New Jersey	1,110	+2 Comedy, The Asterplace, James Carter Cathcart, COMezik, Charles Dunbar, Tiffany Grant, Hoh Daiko Taiko, Michele Knotz, Jamie McGonnigal, Scott A. Melzer, Daman Mills, Sarah Palmer, Uncle Yo, Greg Wicker, and Stuart Zagnit.
January 5–6, 2018	Rowan College at Gloucester County; Sewell, New Jersey	1,020	+2 Comedy, The Asterplace, James Carter Cathcart, Hoh Daiko Taiko, Natalie Hoover, Kazha, Michele Knotz, Michaela Laws, Jamie McGonnigal, Scott A. Melzer, Daman Mills, Alejandro Saab, and The Slants.
January 11–12, 2019	Rowan College at Gloucester County; Sewell, New Jersey		James Carter Cathcart, Gelatine, Hoh Daiko Taiko, Kiba, Michele Knotz, Jamie McGonnigal, Scott A. Melzer, Daman Mills, Megan Shipman, Paul St. Peter, Brad Swaile, and Uncle Yo.
January 10–11, 2020	Rowan College at Gloucester County; Sewell, New Jersey		Charles Dunbar, Hoh Daiko Taiko, Jamie McGonnigal, Scott A. Melzer, Show Us Your Pokeballs, and Uncle Yo.

== See also ==
- List of anime conventions
- List of festivals in New Jersey
