= Anime USA =

Annual anime convention in Washington, D.C.

Coordinates: 38°50′55″N 77°3′6″W

- Status: Active
- Venue: Westfields Marriott Washington Dulles
- Location: Chantilly, Virginia
- Country: United States
- Inaugurated: 1999
- Attendance: 3,608 in 2009
- Filing status: 501(c)(3)
- Website: https://www.animeusa.org/

Anime USA (AUSA) is an annual three-day anime convention held during October/November at the Westfields Marriott Washington Dulles in Chantilly, Virginia.

== Programming ==
The convention typically features an AMV contest, artist's alley, cosplay contest, dealer's room, host club/maid cafe, LARP, musical performances, tabletop gaming, video rooms, and workshop rooms.

== History ==
The Northern Virginia Anime Association first organized the convention. Anime USA moved from the Sheraton Premiere in Tyson's Corner to the Hyatt Regency Crystal City in 2007, a location previously used by Katsucon and Otakon, due to the convention's growth. Renovations and the Hyatt Regency Crystal City layout caused problems during the 2008 convention. In 2010, the video games room was located in a sectioned off part of the parking garage, with at times a cap of 45 people, due to crowding and fire marshal concerns. In 2011 the video game room had to moved out of the parking garage due to concerns from the fire marshal, causing board gaming to be cancelled. For 2012, Anime USA moved to the Washington Marriott Wardman Park in Washington, D.C.

The convention partnered with the Make-A-Wish Foundation in 2011 to help an ill girl attend the convention. The conventions charity auction raised $3,621.25 for the Taylor Anderson '04 Memorial Gift Fund in 2011. The charity auction in 2012 benefited The DC Arts and Humanities Education Collaborative. Anime USA 2020 was cancelled due to the COVID-19 pandemic. No convention was held in 2021 due to the continuing COVID-19 pandemic, along with Anime USA's venue closing.

Anime USA returned to the Hyatt Regency Crystal City At Reagan National Airport in 2022. The convention for 2026 will move to the Westfields Marriott Washington Dulles in Chantilly, Virginia.

=== Event history ===
Dates	Location	Atten.	Guests
October 15–17, 1999	Crowne Plaza Washington National Airport Hotel; Arlington, Virginia		Jan Scott-Frazier.
September 8–10, 2000	Holiday Inn Rosslyn Westpark Hotel at Key Bridge; Arlington, Virginia	200	Steve Bennett, Austell "DJ Asu" Callwood, Michael Granberry, and Jan Scott-Frazier.
October 12–14, 2001	Holiday Inn Rosslyn Westpark; Arlington, Virginia	475	Steve Bennett, Austell "DJ Asu" Callwood, Jaxon Lee, Jan Scott-Frazier, Doug Smith, and Amanda Winn-Lee.
October 11–13, 2002	Sheraton Premiere in Tyson's Corner (Note: AnimeUSA and other time period sources have hotel named as Sheraton Premiere in Tyson's Corner.); Vienna, Virginia (Note: Time period sources have hotel in Vienna, Virginia.)	800	Hiroshi Aro, Steve Bennett, Al Bigley, Keith Burgess, Kelli Shayne Butler, Austell "DJ Asu" Callwood, Christina Chen, Jo Chen, Amy Howard-Wilson, Andy Lee, Hidenori Matsubara, Scott McNeil, Pop Mhan, Mustard Seed Comics, Tantara "Tani" Person, Ryuhana Press, Jan Scott-Frazier, Patrick Strange, Temple Studios, and Terry Tymczyna.
November 21–23, 2003	Sheraton Premiere in Tyson's Corner; Vienna, Virginia	1,500	Steve Bennett, Austell "DJ Asu" Callwood, T. Campbell, Christina Chen, Jo Chen, Greg Eatroff, Sanford Greene, Amy Howard-Wilson, Shimpei Itoh, Carol Jacobanis, L. Jagi Lamplighter, Andy Lee, Jamie McGonnigal, David Newbold, Mio Odagi, Otaku Duet, Chris Patton, Christian Savage, Jan Scott-Frazier, Patrick Strange, Shawn the Touched, and Terry Tymczyna.
October 29–31, 2004	Sheraton Premiere in Tyson's Corner; Vienna, Virginia	2,339	Robert V. Aldrich, Greg Ayres, Steve Bennett, Eirik Blackwolf, Austell "DJ Asu" Callwood, Camino, Ron Chiu, James Harknell, Onezumi Hartstein, Janyse Jaud, Shizumi Manale, Monica Rial, Leo Saunders, Carrie Savage, Jan Scott-Frazier, Sue Shambaugh, Joe Silver, Doug Smith, Shawn the Touched, David L. Williams, and Toshifumi Yoshida.
November 18–20, 2005	Sheraton Premiere in Tyson's Corner; Vienna, Virginia	2,800	Robert V. Aldrich, Greg Ayres, Eirik Blackwolf, Matt Boyd, Ron Chiu, Kara Dennison, Caitlin Glass, Hilary Haag, Yaya Han, Mohammad "Hawk" Haque, Pop Mhan, Vic Mignogna, Move, Nen Daiko, Ananth Panagariya, Chris Patton, Monica Rial, Jez Roth, Kristine Sa, Leo Saunders, Takafumi Sekiguchi, Joe Silver, and David L. Williams.
November 17–19, 2006	Sheraton Premiere in Tyson's Corner; Vienna, Virginia	3,482	Robert V. Aldrich, Greg Ayres, Eirik Blackwolf, Jo Chen, Karen Dick, Ricky Dick, Crispin Freeman, Marty Gear, Caitlin Glass, Dave Lister, Chris "Kilika" Malone, MAX, Pop Mhan, Tee Morris, Nen Daiko, Chris Patton, PLID, Monica Rial, Rosiel, Jez Roth, Leo Saunders, Patrick Seitz, Brian Wilson, and X-Strike Studios.
November 16–18, 2007	Hyatt Regency Crystal City; Arlington, Virginia		Back-On, Capital Area Budokai, Jo Chen, Luci Christian, Colleen Clinkenbeard, Richard Epcar, Mohammad "Hawk" Haque, Chris Hazelton, Charlene Ingram, Chris "Kilika" Malone, Haruka Miyabi, Tee Morris, Nen Daiko, Ananth Panagariya, Kristine Sa, Patrick Seitz, Ellyn Stern, Amanda Tomasch, Brett Weaver, E. K. Weaver, and Michael Wetterhahn.
October 10–12, 2008	Hyatt Regency Crystal City; Arlington, Virginia	3,482	Jason Canty, Jo Chen, Lori Collins, Robert DeJesus, Freezepop, Caitlin Glass, Garth Graham, Mohammad "Hawk" Haque, Matt Herms, Cherami Leigh, Dave Lister, Tee Morris, Miguel Antonio Nieves, Yuko "Aido" Ota, Ananth Panagariya, Chris Patton, Peelander-Z, Alison Rementer, Antimere Robinson, Jez Roth, Patrick Seitz, Allison Strom, Michael "Mookie" Terracciano, Dirk Tiede, Versailles Philharmonic Quintet, and Brian Wilson.
November 20–22, 2009	Hyatt Regency Crystal City; Arlington, Virginia	3,608	Troy Baker, Steve Blum, Jo Chen, Leah Clark, The Clockwork Dolls, Lori Collins, Yaya Han, Mohammad "Hawk" Haque, Matt Herms, Kaya, Dave Lister, Yuko "Aido" Ota, Ananth Panagariya, Quaff, Michael Sinterniklaas, Allison Strom, J. Michael Tatum, and Dirk Tiede.
November 12–14, 2010	Hyatt Regency Crystal City; Arlington, Virginia	4,500 (est)	12012, Takuya Angel, Heidi Arnhold, Kevin Bolk, Breathlessaire, The Clockwork Dolls, echostream, Monica Gallagher, Yaya Han, Lady Ava, Dave Lister, DJ Luminal, Mary Elizabeth McGlynn, Meghan Murphy, Steve Napierski, Brina Palencia, Promise Sisters, Christopher Sabat, Patrick Seitz, Michael Sinterniklaas, DJ Speed Demon, Starlighthoney, Donnie Sturges, and Danny Valentini.
November 18–20, 2011	Hyatt Regency Crystal City; Arlington, Virginia	5,000 (est)	Blood, Kevin Bolk, Eien Strife, Erin Fitzgerald, James Harknell, Onezumi Hartstein, H. A. "Chezhnian" Kennedy, Tina Lam, Wendee Lee, Krys "Ambrosia" Lewis, Dave Lister, Matenrou Opera, Miguel Antonio Nieves, Trina Nishimura, Tony Oliver, Kambrea Pratt, Thom Pratt, Alison Rementer, Monica Rial, Mighty Mike Saga, SiSeN, Micah Solusod, DJ Speed Demon, J. Michael Tatum, and Uncle Yo.
November 9–11, 2012	Washington Marriott Wardman Park; Washington, D.C.		Chipocrite, Richard Ian Cox, Marty Gear, Caitlin Glass, Michele Knotz, Phil LaMarr, Cherami Leigh, Dave Lister, Mix Speakers, Inc, Jamie Noguchi, Platform One, Kambrea Pratt, Thom Pratt, Elizabeth Schram, Keith Silverstein, DJ Speed Demon, Paul St. Peter, Danny Valentini, Video Game Orchestra, and Lex Winter.
September 13–15, 2013	Washington Marriott Wardman Park; Washington, D.C.		Back-On, Laura Bailey, Troy Baker, Breathlessaire, David Brehm, Byron Connell, Jesse James Felice, Garth Graham, Hiroaki Inoue, Catherine Jones, Danny Kang, Dave Lister, Lilith Lore, Mike McFarland, Kyoko Okamoto, Psyche Corporation, Roger Shackelford, Sisen, Christopher Corey Smith, DJ Speed Demon, Starlighthoney, Michael "Mookie" Terracciano, Kari Wahlgren, Travis Willingham, Lex Winter, and Stephanie Young.
October 3–5, 2014	Washington Marriott Wardman Park; Washington, D.C.		Steve Blum, Johnny Yong Bosch, Eyeshine, Charlene Ingram, Kaya, Michele Knotz, Lauren Landa, Schwarz Stein, J. Michael Tatum, Lex Winter and Joshua Hart.
October 30 - November 1, 2015	Washington Marriott Wardman Park; Washington, D.C.		Beau Billingslea, Steve Blum, Colleen Clinkenbeard, Melissa Fahn, Anna Fischer, Sarah Hodge-Wetherbe, Wendee Lee, Lord Ramirez, Lilith Lore, Kass McGann, Mary Elizabeth McGlynn, Brandon Potter, and Psyche Corporation.
October 21–23, 2016	Washington Marriott Wardman Park; Washington, D.C.		Jessie James Grelle, Sarah Hodge-Wetherbe, E. Jason Liebrecht, Manly Battleships, Kate Oxley, Professor Shyguy, Psyche Corporation, Jad Saxton, Micah Solusod, Alexis Tipton, and Lex Winter.
December 8–10, 2017	Washington Marriott Wardman Park; Washington, D.C.		Robert V. Aldrich, Ilya Alekseyev, Chris Cason, Leah Clark, Disorganization XIII, Edo Bushido, Fire Lily, Sarah Hodge-Wetherbe, Kuniko Kanawa, Ralph Lambiase, Briana Lawrence, Mason Lieberman, Trina Nishimura, Chris Patton, Oscar Seung, Matt Stagmer, The Triforce Quartet, Dave Trosko, Jessica Walsh, Lisle Wilkerson.
October 19-21, 2018	Washington Marriott Wardman Park; Washington, D.C.		Akidearest, Robert V. Aldrich, The Anime Man, Kira Buckland, Jim Cummings, Crispin Freeman, Sarah Hodge-Wetherbe, Lisa Ortiz, John Ratzenberger, Monica Rial, Mighty Mike Saga, The Sound Bee HD, DJ Speed Demon, Karen Strassman, Super Art Fight, Lex Winter, and Toshifumi Yoshida.
November 1-3, 2019	Washington Marriott Wardman Park; Washington, D.C.		Sarah Hodge-Wetherbe, Xanthe Huynh, Kuniko Kanawa, Michele Knotz, Cherami Leigh, Faye Mata, Daman Mills, Bryce Papenbrook, and Keith Silverstein.
October 14-16, 2022	Hyatt Regency Crystal City; At Reagan National Airport; Arlington, Virginia		Tiffany Grant, Sarah Hodge-Wetherbe, Emi Lo, Chris Patton, and Sarah Anne Williams.
September 22-24, 2023	Hyatt Regency Crystal City; At Reagan National Airport; Arlington, Virginia		Bennett Abara, Asheru, Aaron Campbell, Sean Chiplock, Mary Claypool, Les E. Claypool III, Amelia Gotham, Joe Hernandez, Sarah Hodge-Wetherbe, Emi Lo, Jamie Mortellaro, Molly Searcy, Shing02, and Substantial.
October 11-13, 2024	Hyatt Regency Crystal City; At Reagan National Airport; Arlington, Virginia		Jordan Dash Cruz, Jill Harris, Sarah Hodge-Wetherbe, Emi Lo, Mallorie Rodak, and Spike Spencer.
October 10-12, 2025	Hyatt Regency Crystal City; At Reagan National Airport; Arlington, Virginia		Aaron Campbell, Joe Hernandez, Sarah Hodge-Wetherbe, Kyle McCarley, Kayleigh McKee, Jack Stansbury, and Super Art Fight.
November 20-22, 2026	Westfields Marriott Washington Dulles; Chantilly, Virginia		Kevin Bolk, Dessi-Desu, Ironmouse, Anastasia Munoz, Neo Atomic Motor, Saberspark, Carrie Savage, and Natalie Van Sistine.

== Notoriety ==
Edward Snowden attended Anime USA 2002 and received attention while playing the video game Tekken.
