= Sport Billy =

- Developed by: Arthur Nadel
- Voices of: Lane Scheimer; Frank Welker; Joyce Bulifant; Lou Scheimer; Corinne Orr; Lionel Wilson; Peter Fernandez
- Country of origin: United States
- Original language: English
- No. of seasons: 1
- No. of episodes: 26

Production
- Executive producers: Norm Prescott; Lou Scheimer
- Running time: 30 minutes
- Production companies: Filmation; Sport Billy Limited; Telemundi AG; AFU Productions

Original release
- Network: NBC
- Release: September 16, 1980 – November 16, 1981

Sport Billy is an animated television series produced in 1980 by Filmation in the United States, based on the German comic book of the same name created by Rolf Deyhle in 1977, whose eponymous hero is a boy who promotes sportsmanship. A single 26-episode season was produced, first broadcast in Germany and other parts of Europe from 1980 to 1981. In 1982, Filmation carried the show over to the United States for syndication, and as a summer replacement for The Adventures of Rocky and Bullwinkle and Friends in NBC's Saturday morning children's programming.

== Synopsis ==
The story revolves around a young boy named Sport Billy, who is from the planet Olympus (a twin of Earth on the opposite side of the Sun), which is populated by athletic god-like beings, ruled by the benevolent President Sportikus XI and his wife, Pandusa. Billy himself has a magic size-changing gym bag, the Omni-Sack, which produces various tools as he needs them. He travels to Earth on a mission to promote teamwork and sportsmanship. Described by the show's theme song as a "hero from another planet", Billy battles the evil Queen Vanda and her gnome-like henchman, Sipe. Vanda's mission is to destroy all sports in the galaxy since fairness disgusts her.

Billy is assisted by two faithful companions, his girlfriend named Sport Lilly and her talking dog named Willy. The trio travels around in a time traveling spaceship named the Timeship, which is mounted on two rocket engines and resembles a giant wind-up clock, complete with a ringing bell. In each episode the trio travels through time in order to save a different Earth sport from Vanda's grasp.

== Production ==
Sport Billy was originally a German comic character created by Rolf Deyhle out of his love for cartoons in 1977, and already had a presence in Europe and parts of Latin America. The comics were written and drawn by Walter Neugebauer, Gisela Künstner, and Kurt Italiaander, and followed the sporting adventures of Billy, his friends Susy and Dickie (who was later dropped from the comics), and his dog Hannibal. Sport Billy was adopted by FIFA as the fair-play mascot for the FIFA World Cup, and a trophy of the character was presented to the sporting team at the 1978 tournament. The character was internationally used as a mascot in many sporting youth programs, for the purpose of promoting sportsmanship and fair play. Sport Billy Productions, owners of the Sport Billy franchise, licensed the property to Filmation so that the studio could create a cartoon based on the character. As a European character, Sport Billy's main sport was association football, and this was reflected in the introductory sequence of the program. Susy and Hannibal were renamed "Lilly" and "Willy".

The series consisted of 26 episodes. It was marketed at MIPTV Media Market in Cannes in April 1980, and first broadcast in September by ARD in West Germany. In the original English version, Sport Billy was voiced by Lane Scheimer, the son of producer Lou Scheimer, who voiced the Olympian Computer. Sport Lilly, Queen Vanda and Pandusa were voiced by Joyce Bulifant, and Willy, Sportikus XI, Sipe and Poco were voiced by Frank Welker. The series was scheduled for broadcast on NBC in the United States in the fall of 1980, but the US Olympics boycott almost bankrupted NBC, whose payment for the broadcasting rights was predicated on high domestic interest. The series was shelved for two years until after the 1982 FIFA World Cup, when it aired as a summer replacement for The Adventures of Rocky and Bullwinkle and Friends in NBC's Saturday morning children's programming. (Note: Attributed to multiple references:) It was the last first-run series produced by Filmation to air on NBC. The series was also shown in the United Kingdom, Ireland, France, Gibraltar, Italy, Yugoslavia, Brazil, Australia, New Zealand, the Netherlands, Greece, Cyprus, Spain, Turkey, Peru, Mexico, Portugal, Romania, Czechoslovakia and other countries. In contrast to its success elsewhere, the series did lower numbers in U.S. syndication than Rocky and Bullwinkle, The Jetsons and Jonny Quest, but more than The Space Kidettes, The Roman Holidays and Samson & Goliath.

Parts of the early episodes were recut into a television film shown on HBO in 1980 and RTÉ2 in 1986. It was written by Reubin Guberman, produced by William L. Cooper Jr. and Wolfgang Stein, and directed by Peter Fernandez. All the voices in the film were redubbed by Fernandez, Corinne Orr and Lionel Wilson to fit in the new script for linking the episodes together. The film was released split in parts as "episodes" on VHS in the UK.

== Voice cast ==
- Lane Scheimer as Sport Billy
- Joyce Bulifant as Sport Lilly, Queen Vanda, Pandusa, additional voices
- Frank Welker as Willy, Sipe, Poco, Sportikus XI, additional voices
- Lou Scheimer (uncredited) as Olympian Computer, additional voices
- Corinne Orr (uncredited) as Sport Billy, Sport Lilly, Queen Vanda, Pandusa, additional voices (film)
- Lionel Wilson (uncredited) as Willy, Sipe, Olympian Computer, additional voices (film)
- Peter Fernandez (uncredited) as Sportikus XI, Narrator, additional voices (film)

== Crew ==
- Developed by Arthur Nadel
- Writers: Paul Aratow, Paul Dini, Dan DiStefano, Barry Gaines, Jack Hanrahan, Martha Humphreys, Coslough Johnson, Ted Pedersen, Tom Ruegger

== Episode list ==
No.	Title	ARD air date	NBC air date
1	"Joust in Time/Sports of the Round Table"	16 September 1980	31 July 1982
Billy, Lilly and Willy attend a football Colosseum in Madrid. During the game, the Colosseum disappears, and they discover that Vanda has traveled back in time, erasing the Colosseum from existence and imprisoning Merlin in a crystal. The trio sets out to restore history while promoting fair play.
2	"Trouble in Tokyo"	23 September 1980	31 July 1982
Billy, Lilly and Willy are attacked by street thugs led by Sipe in Tokyo, so they enroll in karate lessons.
3	"Mexican Holiday"	30 September 1980	31 July 1982
Ancient Indian Aztec thieves steal treasures from a museum in Mexico City, riding on Quetzalcōātl.
4	"Return to Olympus"	7 October 1980	31 July 1982
Lilly enters the annual Olympian Games on Olympus, with kids from all over the universe participating. Vanda provides a girl named Beth with a Nega-Sack full of dirty tricks to interfere with Lilly.
5	"Chinese Puzzle"	14 October 1980	7 August 1982
Vanda lures Billy, Lilly and Willy into a trap, then replaces Billy with a Vandalucian agent disguised as him at a ping-pong tournament in China to ruin his reputation. Lilly and Willy help Billy escape to expose the imposter.
6	"Teamwork"	21 October 1980	7 August 1982
Black Sport uses a miniaturizing ray to shrink and capture sports heroes, including Billy, Lilly, Willy, a basketball player and a baseball player. He holds the heroes for ransom for Vanda to add to her personal collection. They collaborate as a team to escape Black Sport and reverse the effects.
7	"Bad Weather Blues"	28 October 1980	7 August 1982
France is under attack of Vanda's Weather Star device, which causes storms to disrupt outdoor sports events. Billy, Lilly and Willy team up with meteorologist Dr. DuCloud to disable the device.
8	"A Voice in the Wilderness"	4 November 1980	7 August 1982
Sipe has taught his parrot Poco to speak. They and a Vandalucian agent persuade the Tasaday tribe chief to use his powers to control the animals and turn them against the city folk.
9	"Wheel of Fortune"	11 November 1980	14 August 1982
Billy, Lilly, and Willy visit the Monte Carlo Grand Prix, where Lilly meets her friend Betty. Vanda sabotages Betty's racing car and kidnaps its driver, George, in order for Sipe to win the race. Billy, Lilly and Willy recover the car, and Betty takes the wheel.
10	"Hyde and Seek"	18 November 1980	14 August 1982
Vanda travels to 1886 London and forces Dr. Jekyll to release his serum, turning the present-day population into monsters. Billy, Lilly and Willy meet detective Inspector Olivia Fairfax, and team up to prevent the catastrophe.
11	"Power of the Omni-Sack"	25 November 1980	14 August 1982
At the St. Moritz winter games, Vanda convinces Lilly's cousin Mark Shaw to sabotage Billy's Omni-Sack, replacing it with a fake bag and using its contents to win the skiing and skating competitions.
12	"A Race in Space"	2 December 1980	14 August 1982
Vanda sends a team of Vandalucian agents, including Space Rat, to participate in the Trans-Solar System Space Race in 2121 in the future. Space Rat uses dirty tricks to wipe out other racers. Billy, Lilly, Willy and Captain Lance race through space in the Silver Sun.
13	"Trial by Fire"	9 December 1980	21 August 1982
Vanda tricks a girl named Leilani into placing a device at Pele's Altar, which will reignite the extinct volcanoes of Hawaii and ruin the island's spas and surf events.
14	"The Great Texas Hole in One"	16 December 1980	21 August 1982
Billy, Lilly and Willy team up with a hot-headed golfer, Peewee Junk, to investigate a mysterious oil eruption from the ground during a Texas golf tournament.
15	"Arabian Knights and Days"	23 December 1980	21 August 1982
Dr. Twister targets Arabian horse races, sabotaging them with sandstorms unleashed by his cyclone machine. Billy, Lilly and Willy team up with Prince Rami and Ahmed to calm the desert and secure the event.
16	"Mixed Doubles"	30 December 1980	21 August 1982
Professor Plant invents a growth serum that turns plants into monsters. He uses it on the vegetation of Rio de Janeiro, unleashing an attack on the city during a tennis match.
17	"Viking for a Day"	14 September 1981	28 August 1982
Billy opens a sailing exhibit at the Viking museum in Oslo, Norway. Sipe sabotages the exhibition by sending a Viking ship back to 998 A.D. via a time-warp. Billy and his friends travel to 998 A.D., where he competes with Viktor the Violent in Viking sports challenges to retrieve the ship.
18	"Monster from the Loch"	21 September 1981	28 August 1982
Golf courses in Scotland are vandalized by mysterious gas bubbles from the ground. Billy's investigation leads to him, Lilly and Willy encountering a Vandalucian agent called the Shark, the Loch Ness Monster, and poet Robert Burns.
19	"Mystery of the Russian Cave"	28 September 1981	28 August 1982
Billy, Lilly and Willy discover a steam cave in the Caucasus Mountains. They are led into the cave by a Vandalucian agent named Saq and Sipe (posing as Professor Vladimir Volchar of Volga University and his assistant Sam Oker), but soon learn that the two are destroying the cave and stealing the hot water energy so that Vanda can prevent water sports in Russia.
20	"Rah! Rah! Billy!"	5 October 1981	28 August 1982
Sipe, Poco and their gorilla-like Vandalucian henchman steal an invincibility ray, using it to disrupt a football match.
21	"Peril in Peru"	12 October 1981	4 September 1982
Billy and his friends travel to Peru for the Caballo de Passo equestrian competition. Vanda attempts to sabotage the event by having Poco drop a Vandalucian agent named Weasel's "Madness Plants" in the horses' trough. Billy steps in to save the competition.
22	"Athenian Adventure"	19 October 1981	4 September 1982
Vanda captures Sporticus and Pandusa and freezes them in time. Billy, Lilly and Willy travel back to ancient Greece to restore them.
23	"Pure Luck"	26 October 1981	4 September 1982
Vanda sends Sipe and Poco to steal the 1st prize cup for an ice hockey game. Billy infiltrates Vandalucia and retrieves the cup, but the cup is knocked against the Timeship's compass, causing the ship to crash into the snow. Billy and his friends make their way to the game via sled dogs and skiing, where they compete against Vandalucian agents.
24	"Taj Mahal Mystery"	2 November 1981	4 September 1982
Billy opens the field hockey national playoffs in India. Vanda plans to disrupt the game and steal the Taj Mahal using hypnotic powers.
25	"Australian Adventure"	9 November 1981	4 September 1982
A Vandalucian agent named Dr. Bakbok captures kangaroos from the Australian Outback and uses ultrasonic waves to control them, training them to become better at tennis than professional players.
26	"A Tale of Two Billys"	16 November 1981	4 September 1982
Vanda sends Sipe and Poco to the Wild West, where they meet an outlaw named Billy and kidnap a Native American messenger, preventing him from bringing good sportsmanship to stickball. This causes a brawl to break out in a lacrosse game. Billy and his friends travel back in time to rescue the messenger.

== Public service announcements ==
In addition to this series, there were also ten 30-second public service announcements produced by Michael Sporn Animation for syndicated television during the general period when the series aired. These spots also taught the value of fair play and sportsmanship, but without the plot of the series.

== Musical group ==
During the 1982 FIFA World Cup in Spain, in which Argentina participated, Buenos Aires-based music label Tonodisc S.A. held a mass casting to create a children's musical group that would promote sports through music and encourage Argentina in that World Cup. The group was named "Sport-Billy", and consisted of Fabiana Íncola, Analía Santos, Luis Gasparini, Marcelo Ragonesse and Walter Ferreyra. They released their first album on December 5, 1981, with their songs produced and directed by Bubby Lavecchia. In May 1982, they visited Peru to promote themselves and perform at the Estádio Nacional and the Jesús Obrero Coliseum in Comas, as well as in other towns in the country such as Iquitos, Tacna, Trujillo and Piura. In Lima, they were interviewed on various popular radio stations of the time, such as Radio Miraflores, Radio Panamericana, Radio 1160, and Radio Onda Popular Perú. The group also performed on Show del Tío Pepe on Radio Unión, with a multitudinous reception from the auditorium of said station.

In December 1982, Sport-Billy returned on their second visit to Peru and again visited the radio stations. This time, the songs were slightly more oriented toward youth, such as "100 kilos de barro" and "Medley a Triny Lopez". Sport-Billy performed again at the Estádio Nacional to modest success. They also performed on Segunda Teletón on Panamericana Televisión. According to Íncola, "That night of the presentation at the Estádio Nacional I was very sick, with a fever, but I got over it and went out to perform, and with the love of the public I was cured."

It was not until 1983 that Sport-Billy launched in Peru, with its second album on records and cassettes promoted by Panamericana Televisión. At that time in Argentina, amidst bitter discussions between the parents of the children and the record company, they released a shared album with the Spanish group Sus Amigos/Viva's (made up of former members of Parchis) entitled Vamos a la Playa. This album, although never released in the country, was promoted by Sport-Billy's fan club on different stations hoping for a return of the group. Shortly after the release of that album came Superagentes y titanes, an Argentine catch-up film in which Sport-Billy participated with two songs from their second album and two unreleased songs. The film was released in neighborhood theaters in Lima such as the now-defunct Cines México and Cines Bolívar. After this, the group broke up and Tonodisc ceased operations.

Since the group's last visit to Peru, Sport-Billy's fan club grew over time and became the radio station Sol Frecuencia Primera. In December 2008, the station's director and founder, journalist Sandro Parodi Cerna, interviewed Íncola (now a mother of three children) via telephone in episode 43 of the journalist program Extremos, to the surprise of the former singer. Íncola recorded a song by the group Sin Bandera, "Que Me Alcance la Vida", although she stated that she no longer dedicates herself professionally to singing. This brought about a "nostalgic rebirth" of Sport-Billy on social networks in Latin America, with Íncola and Ragonesse receiving admirers on Facebook.

== Sources ==
- Scheimer, Lou; Mangels, Andy (December 15, 2012). Creating The Filmation Generation. TwoMorrows. ISBN 9781605490441.
