= Otaku Unite! =

- DVD cover
- Directed by: Eric Bresler
- Produced by: Movies of My Dreams Productions
- Edited by: Eric Bresler
- Release date: 2004
- Running time: 70 minutes
- Country: United States
- Language: English

Otaku Unite! is a 2004 documentary film by Eric Bresler on American fans of Japanese culture, specifically anime and manga, known as otaku.

== Summary ==
Otaku Unite! provides a history of otaku-fandom and an introduction to anime conventions, with a focus on the fans themselves. A variety of individuals are featured throughout interviews, including anime voice actors such as Corinne Orr and Peter Fernandez, industry representatives, convention directors and a plethora of "otaku" anime fans.

== Production ==
Initially Bresler had planned to create a short, 15-minute film. Filming turned into a 3 1/2-year project, culminating in a near-feature-length film. Extras on the DVD come to 130 minutes.

== Reception ==
Otaku Unite! has been shown at a number of anime conventions, as well as film festivals including the 2004 Philadelphia Film Festival. Otaku Unite! has been translated into Japanese and Russian and was featured in the May 2006 issue of the Japanese lifestyle magazine Cyzo.

== See also ==
- Cosplay, a predominant form of fandom featured in the film.
