= Corinne Orr =

Canadian actress

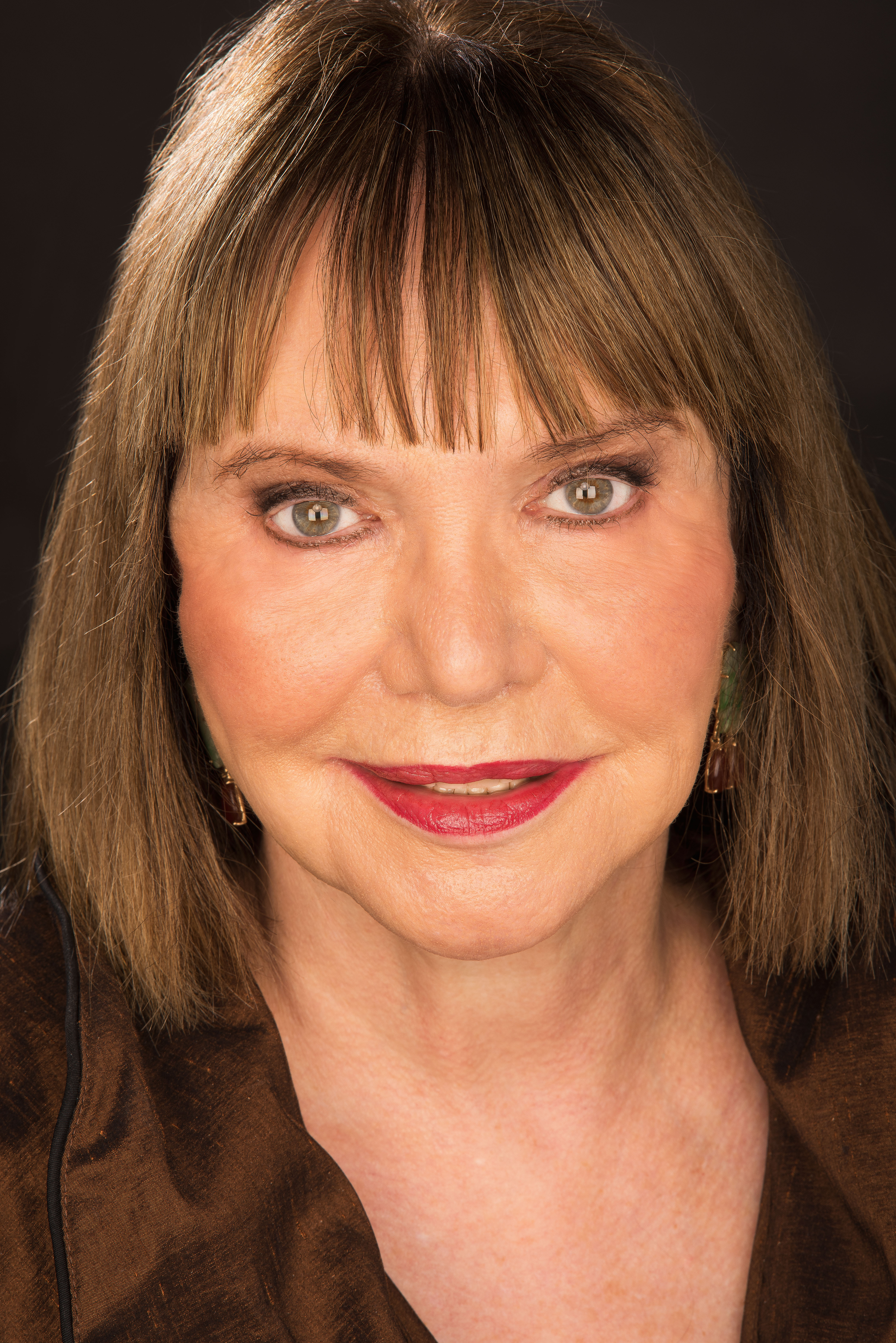
- Orr in 2011
- Born: January 6, 1936 (age 90); Montreal, Quebec, Canada
- Occupations: Actress; spokesperson
- Years active: 1957–present

Corinne Orr (born January 6, 1936) is a Canadian actress. She is best known for her work on the English version of the anime series Speed Racer.

== Biography ==
Orr became involved in children's theatre beginning at the age of 10 (with her first role being in Alice in Wonderland) after she began taking elocution lessons due to her French accent, and started to develop her repertoire of voices. By the age of 14, she was working at the Canadian Broadcasting Corporation (CBC), as well as acting in stage theaters at the Mountain Playhouse in Montreal and the Crest Theatre in Toronto, working for the Montreal Shakespearian Company and alongside such notables as William Shatner, Christopher Plummer, and Barry Morse. With her solid background on the stage, Orr was hired by CBC Radio for roles in their radio dramas such as Laura Limited. She then moved to CBC Television to portray the character of Suzie the Mouse in the children's soap opera Chez Helene, a bilingual program devoted to teaching children English and French.

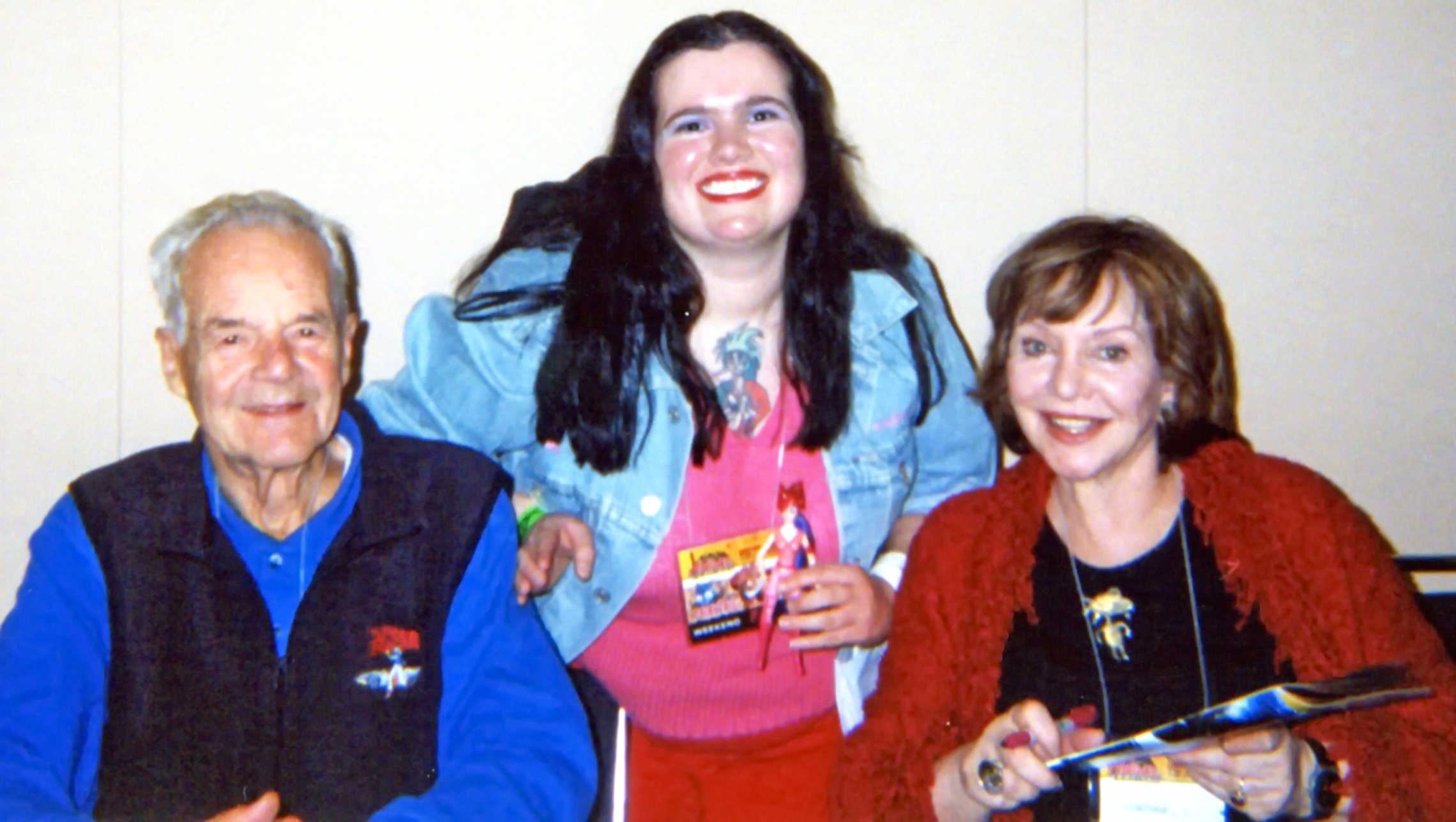
Corinne Orr (right) with Peter Fernandez and a fan of Orr-voiced character Lady Kale (from Princess Gwenevere and the Jewel Riders) at New York Anime Festival 2007

Following her move to New York City, Orr began working regularly on radio and television, and as a voice artist, having been credited over 200 voice-over roles. One of her first jobs was a continuing role in the daytime soap opera The Nurses; others included voice acting roles in several CBS Radio Adventure Theater and CBS Radio Mystery Theater programs. She also began her lucrative career as spokesperson for a variety of companies in a wide range of radio and television commercials. In addition to commercials, Orr has narrated children's stories, provided voices for several dolls, and recorded numerous audiobooks. She was the voice of the Snuggle bear for 15 years and narrated Aliki Brandenberg's Mummies Made in Egypt for the PBS series Reading Rainbow and participated in a special redubbing of an episode of Late Night with David Letterman. Orr's work as a voice actress included dubbing foreign films (including anime films) and series into English. Her television credits include the English versions of several 1960s-1990s Japanese series such as Marine Boy, where she voiced both male and female leads. She has also worked on American cartoon series such as The Adventures of the Galaxy Rangers and Princess Gwenevere and the Jewel Riders, as well as direct-to-video animated films.

She remains best known for her work on the English dubbed version of the 1960s anime Speed Racer, where she portrayed Speed's girlfriend Trixie and all of the female characters, as well as the voice of Speed's kid brother Spritle, who had a raspy voice, and which became a hit and a cult title in the United States. Following the release of the compilation film Speed Racer: The Movie, together with a fellow voice actor on the show, Peter Fernandez, she went on Children's Safety Network-sponsored tours around the country with the Mach 5 car in order to promote their campaign for children's safety. Her voice can be also heard in the 2008 Speed Racer live-action film. After the death of Fernandez in 2010, she became the last surviving English-language cast member of Speed Racer.

Orr judged the Daytime Emmy Awards for 18 years and served on the Screen Actors Guild council for 13 years. She has appeared as a guest of honor at numerous entertainment conventions (often with Fernandez, with whom she has worked together in most of her voice acting roles), including Friends of Old Time Radio, The Hollywood Show, Anime Weekend Atlanta, Zentrancon, Zenkaikon, Anime North, New York Anime Festival, and New York Comic Con. She was featured in Paley Archive's Women in Film series, Anthony Wynn's book Conversations at Warp Speed, and the documentary film Otaku Unite!. She also participated in many charity activities, such as a Pygmalion play where all the money went to a charity, volunteer work at New York hospital, teaching voiceover courses and reading to the homeless.

== Filmography ==
=== Films ===
- A Car's Life: Sparky's Big Adventure- Sparky, Norbert
- Alakazam the Great - DeeDee (speaking)
- Bug Bites: An Ant's Life- Rose, Gigi
- Car's Life 2- Gracie, Sparky
- Car's Life: The Royal Heist - Sparky, Gracie
- Car's Life: Junkyard Blues - Sparky, Gracie
- Enchanted Journey - Nono
- For Those I Loved
- Gammera the Invincible
- Gamera vs. Jiger
- Gnomes
- Godzilla vs. the Sea Monster - Female voices
- Grave of the Fireflies - Setsuko (credited as Rhoda Chrosite) (CPM dub)
- Jack and the Beanstalk - Princess Margaret
- Jack and the Witch - Allegra
- Kai Doh Maru - Oni-hime
- The Little Norse Prince - Hilda
- Noel
- Otaku Unite! - Herself
- Peter Pan - Tiger Lily
- Plan Bee - Bing
- Popeye Meets the Man Who Hated Laughter - Swee'Pea / Olive Oyl / Blondie Bumstead / Cookie Bumstead / Lois Flagston / Dot Flagston / Ditto Flagston / Dale Arden / other voices
- Speed Racer (2008) - Grand Prix female announcer
- Spider's Web: A Pig's Tale - Walt / Ester / Cynthia / Lucy
- Sport Billy - Sport Billy / Lilly / Queen Vanda / Pandusa / additional voices
- Twelve Months - Anja
- The Wild Swans - Elisa / Adult Elisa / Teardrop #1
- The Wonderful World of Puss 'n Boots - Princess Rose

=== TV series ===
- Ace Ventura: Pet Detective
- The Adventures of the Galaxy Rangers - Queen of the Crown / Ingrid Arroyo / Kiwi Kids / additional voices
- The Edge of Night - Mrs. Turner (1980)
- The Flying House - Salome
- Johnny Cypher in Dimension Zero - Zena / Rhom
- Marine Boy - Marine Boy / Neptina / Clicli / all female characters
- PB&J Otter - Wanda Raccoon / Shirley Duck / Georgina Snooty / Betty Lou Beaver
- Princess Gwenevere and the Jewel Riders - Lady Kale (Queen Kale) / Queen Anya
- Reading Rainbow - Herself
- Samurai Jack
- Sesame Street - various voices
- Space Ghost Coast to Coast
- Speed Racer - Trixie Fontaine / Spritle Racer / Mom Racer / additional voices
- Stanley - Grandma Griff
- Star Blazers - Queen Mariposa / Nova (third season)
- Taco & Paco
- Ultraman
- Ultraman Tiga
- The World of Hans Christian Andersen - Elisa / Kitty Kat / Little Boy / Match Girl

=== Home videos ===
- Richard Scarry's Best Busy People Video Ever!
- Richard Scarry's Best Learning Songs Video Ever!
