= The Ricecookers =

American alternative rock band

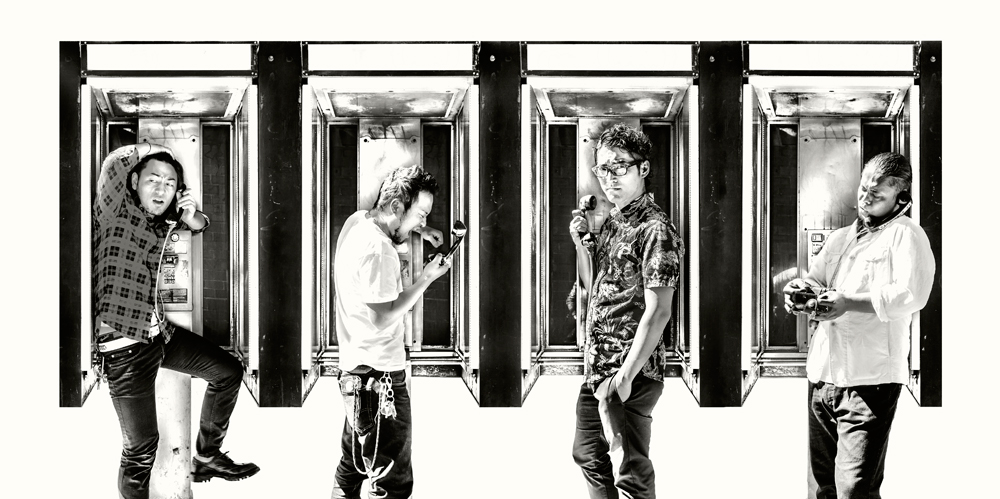
- From left to right: Sohei Oyama, Kota Fujii, Tomo Hiroishi, Daisuke Wakabayashi

Background information
- Origin: Boston, Massachusetts
- Genres: Rock, alternative rock
- Years active: 2004–present
- Labels: BAJ Inc., Anchor Records; production: Zazou Productions, Inc
- Members: Tomomi Hiroishi; Kota Fujii; Daisuke Wakabayashi; Sohei Oyama
- Past members: Masaki Minami; Tom Ulichny
- Website: wearethericecookers.com

The Ricecookers is an alternative rock band formed in Boston, Massachusetts by Tomomi "Tomo" Hiroishi, Kota Fujii, Daisuke Wakabayashi and Sohei Oyama.

The Ricecookers’ songs are written by Hiroishi and Fujii in English and Japanese. The band writes from different influences across a variety of genres including blues, funk, techno, and jazz. The band is known for flashy live performances.

== History ==
Hiroishi was born and raised in Mexico City, while the rest of the band grew up in Japan. They met while studying at the Berklee College of Music in Boston, Massachusetts, and formed the band in 2004.

=== Early years (2004–2006) ===
In 2004, Tomomi Hiroishi asked Kota Fujii and Masaki Minami to start a rock band, hoping to bring together their interest in different genres of music. The original members of The Ricecookers were Tomomi Hiroishi (vocals, guitar), Kota Fujii (guitar), Masaki Minami (guitar), Daisuke Wakabayashi (bass), and Tom Ulichny (drums). The band performed at a wide range of venues in Boston and surrounding areas, with most of their music inspired by groups like Rage Against the Machine, Stevie Ray Vaughan, Maceo Parker and Audioslave. In 2006, Masaki Minami decided to leave the band to go back to Japan, and Sohei Oyama replaced Tom Ulichny as the official drummer. That same year, they released their first self-produced album, 1st Blood in the United States.

=== 2008–present ===
In 2008, The Ricecookers met New York producer Shunji Okada, and collaborated to record their first EP, Four of Our Songs. They participated in events such as Japan Day @ Central Park.

As they worked towards becoming known in the New York area, they made their Japanese debut with a Tokyo tour in the spring of 2010 in Japan. There, film director Yukihiko Tsutsumi saw their performance and bought the rights to their song Nami No Yukusaki for his upcoming television drama series, “Spec” on Tokyo Broadcasting System Television Network in Japan. They custom produced different versions of the same song to fit each episode of the series.

After the tour, The Ricecookers returned to the United States and relocated to New York City from Boston, where they recorded their second EP, Chacmool. Soon after its release in September 2010, Chacmool became the number 1 selling alternative rock album on iTunes Japan. The Ricecookers once again traveled to Japan for their second tour, visiting 5 different cities throughout the country.

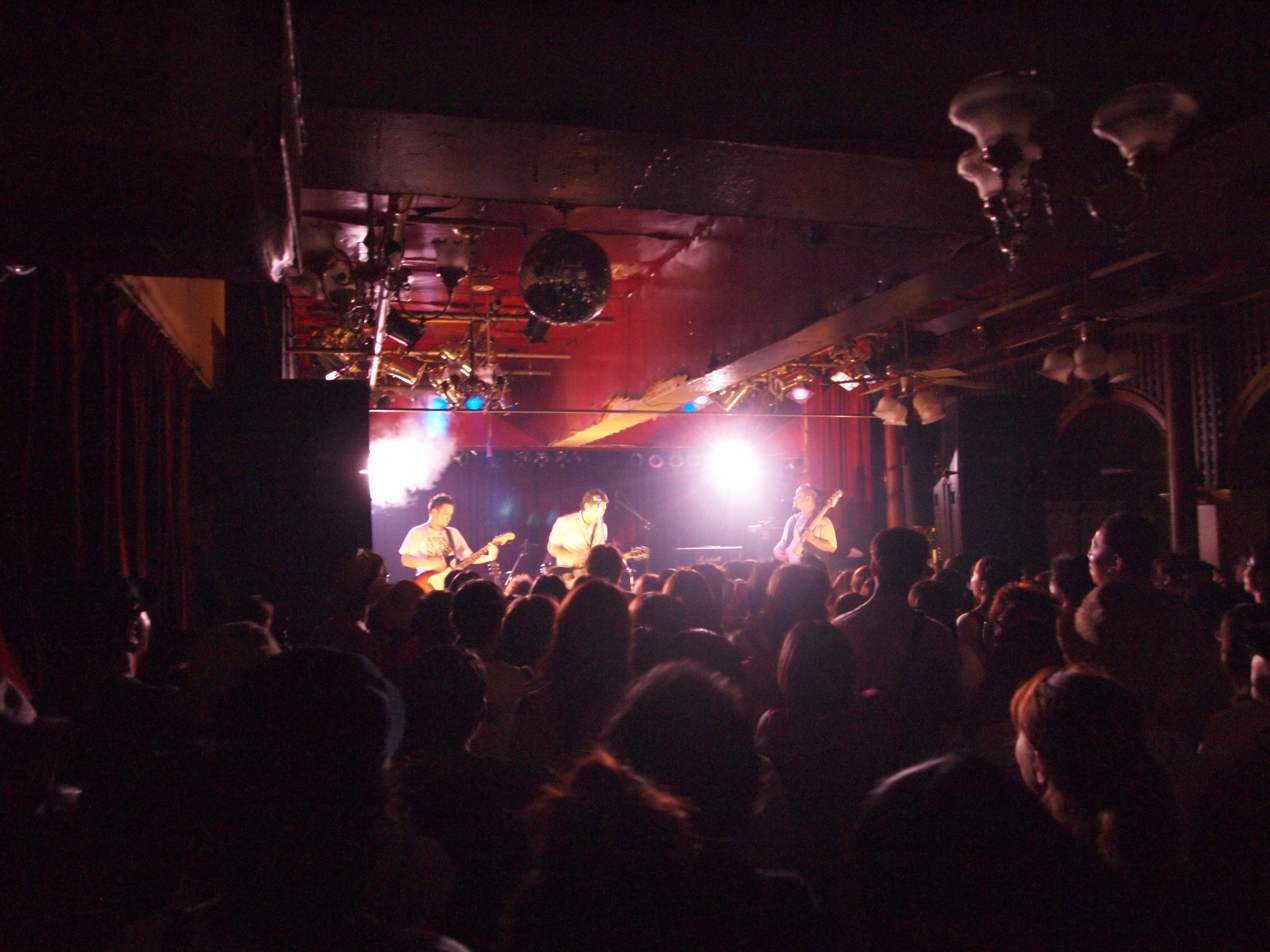
The Ricecookers performing at the Under the Shoes event

The Ricecookers started a two-band event called “Under the Shoes” with fellow Japanese rock band Response. Their final event at Star Lounge in Tokyo was filmed and aired on BS Fuji TV Network and later released on DVD.

On October 8, 2010, their single Nami No Yukisaki aired on the drama series on TBS Network, “Spec”, as its theme song. Along with the premiere of the program, the band became the number 7 most searched keyword on GOOGLE Japan. In December 2010, Anchor Records released the 10 different bilingual versions of Nami no Yukusaki and its music video as a CD-DVD set titled Nami no Yukusaki TV Special Collection. This CD ranked number 1 on the Indie Album & Single Sales Chart on the Billboard JAPAN and number 6 on Oricon Charts.

During the same month, The Ricecookers travelled to Japan for their last tour of the year, and hosted “Under the Shoes Vol. 2” event in Tokyo. They ended the tour headlining for the “Spec Final Episode Event” at Akasaka Blitz in Tokyo. Live recordings from this performance along with their new single, “Lost Raven”, were released by Anchor Records as a mini album titled, Eat, Breathe and Live in April 2011. Shortly after its release, “Lost Raven” was featured as the theme song for the Japanese variety show, “Summers no Yaritaga☆ga~ri~” airing weekly on Thursday nights on the TBS Network. The release of this album caught the eye of Commons & Sense Man, a bilingual magazine, who interviewed The Ricecookers, exposing the band to a wider audience.

In July 2011, The Ricecookers released their first album entitled sélf. The album was produced by Shunji Okada, recorded by Ted Young and Kabir Hermon, and was mastered by George Marino. During the same month, The Ricecookers went on their fourth tour to Japan and held their first 90-minute solo-performances titled, “The Ricecookers self-ish” at La.mama in Tokyo and Taku Taku in Kyoto. Following their solo performance, they returned to New York and attended their first CMJ Music Marathon, which was followed by a nomination in the “Independent Artist of the Year 2011” category by Billboard Japan.

In April 2012, they released Showtime in Japan, and Paradise in the US at the same time. This release was followed by another Japanese CD release, under the title Pied Piper.

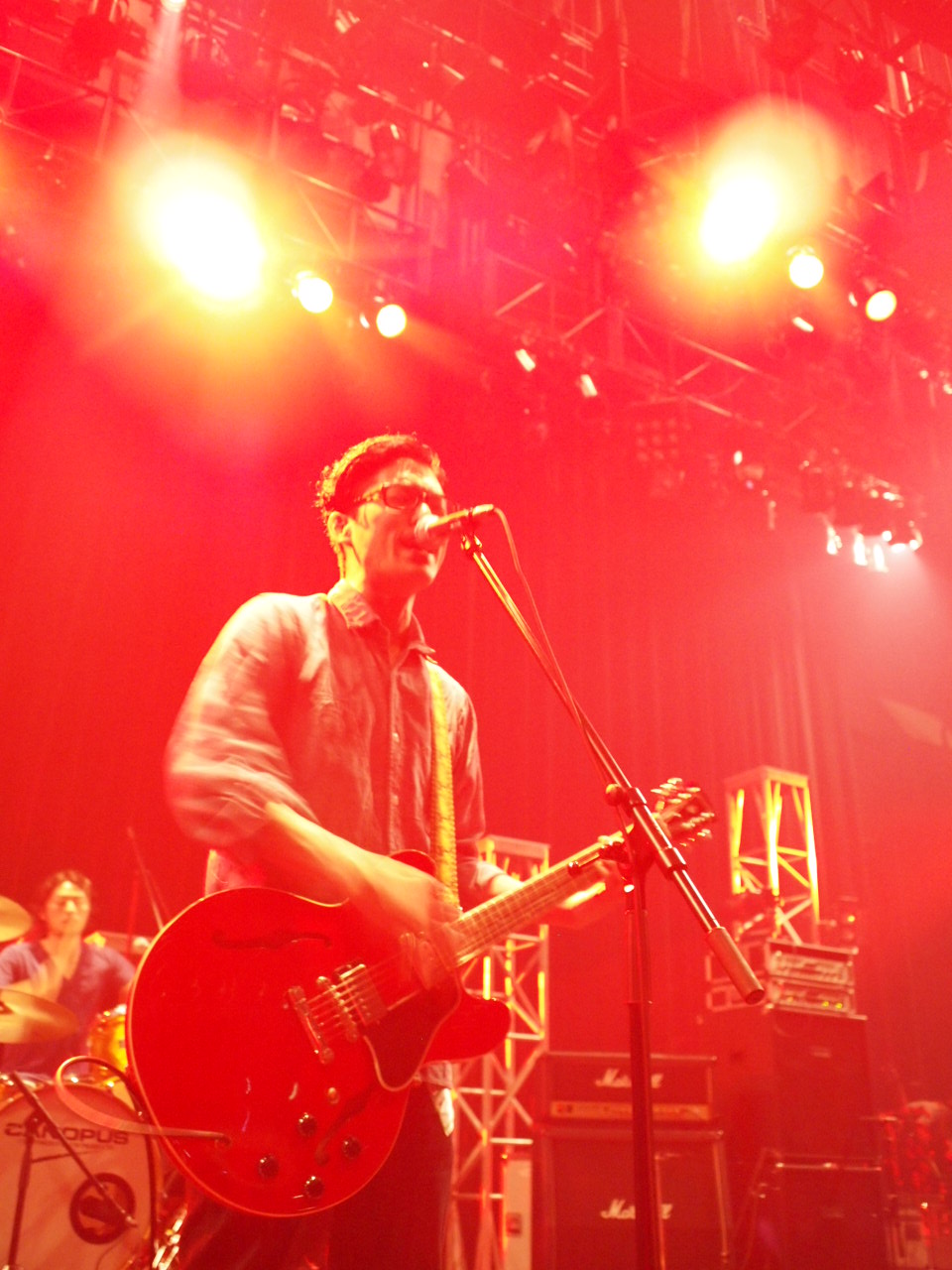
Live performance by The Ricecookers during the Spec movie event

In 2012, the TV drama series "Spec" debuted its first movie, in which The Ricecookers performed yet another version of Nami No Yukusaki. Due to the band contributing the theme song for the movie as well as the TV series, they were invited to the movie premiere event, which was held in Tokyo. 2012 was also the year they performed at Rising Sun Rock Festival in Japan, becoming one of the artists from Japan performing at this event. Later in the year, The Ricecookers appeared on a Japanese year end countdown TV show titled Count Down TV, broadcast live throughout Japan, ringing-in 2013 on live TV.

In 2013, The Ricecookers participated in a charitable music event in New York in March, to raise fund for the 2011 Tōhoku earthquake and tsunami victims and survivors. of the real was also released in 2013. The band got Akihiro Nishino, a Japanese comedian/clay animation artist to create a music video for their album. The same year, the band went on the "Standing Egg Tour", where they toured 4 major states in the East Coast, including their home ground New York, and the band's birthplace Boston. The Ricecookers went on the Standing Egg Tour with Uzuhi, another New York based punk rock band and Kagero, a punk jazz band from Japan for this tour. The event was covered by various Japanese media.

After performing at CMJ Music Marathon again that year, they released their latest full album parallax, in 2014. That year, the band was invited to perform for the long running charity event held in New York City "Rock For Hope", where all the proceeds were donated to fund the educational programs for financially underprivileged children in China. The summer of 2014 also marked the bands Otakon debut at the Baltimore Convention Center. The convention was kicked off with an event titled "Matsuri", which the band performed in. The next day, the band performed again, with an acoustic set. Their performance at the Otakon collided with the release of The Ricecookers' newest EP titled "Again and Again".

In January 2015, the band was invited to perform at KotoriCon at Rowan College at Gloucester County in Sewell, New Jersey. They released a song called Radio Active on November of the same year. In November 2016, The Ricecookers performed at Arlene's Grocery, in New York City. The band has remained inactive ever since.

== Discography ==
- Four of Our Songs (January 2010)
  - Label: BAJ Inc.
- Chacmool (September 2010)
  - Label: BAJ Inc.
    Distribution: Universal Music LLC/IMS
- Nami no Yukusaki (October 2010)
  - Label: Anchor Records
    Distribution: Sony Music
- Nami no Yukusaki TV Special Collection CD-DVD Set (December 2010)
  - Label: Anchor Records
    Distribution: Sony Music
- Eat, Breathe and Live (April 2011)
  - Label:Anchor Records
    Distribution:Sony Music
- 【sélf】 (July 2011)
  - Label: BAJ Inc.
    Distribution: Universal Music LLC/IMS
- Showtime (April 2012)
  - Label: Anchor Records
    Distribution: Sony Music
- Paradise (March 2012)
  - Label: Zazou Productions, Inc.
    Distribution: Sony Music
- PIED PIPER (September 2012)
  - Label: Anchor Records
    Distribution:Sony Music
- Muriyari (December 2012)
  - Label: Anchor Records
    Distribution: Sony Music
- Of the real (May 2013)
  - Label: Anchor Records
    Distribution: Sony Music
- Parallax (December 2013)
  - Label: Anchor Records
    Distribution: Sony Music
