= PortConMaine =

Anime convention in Portland, Maine

Coordinates: 43°39′12″N 70°15′37″W

- Status: Active
- Genre: Anime, gaming, and geek culture
- Venue: Holiday Inn Portland-By The Bay
- Location: Portland, Maine
- Country: United States
- Inaugurated: 2002
- Founder: Julie York
- Attendance: 4,000 (est.) in 2026
- Website: http://portconmaine.com/

PortConMaine is an annual four-day anime and gaming convention held during June at the Holiday Inn Portland-By The Bay in Portland, Maine. PortConMaine was founded by Julie York.

== Programming ==
The convention typically offers artists alley, boardgame tournaments, collectible card games competitions, cosplay competitions, dealers room, film screenings, garage sale, karaoke, and video gaming. Sunday is family day and admissions prices are lower to encourage families to attend.

== History ==
Julie York started PortConMaine in 2002 due to the lack of nerd events in New England, with the first event being held at the University of Southern Maine. PortConMaine added multigenre content to the convention in 2011. In 2014, Thursday's content was for pre-registered attendees only. Despite running out of space at the DoubleTree, the convention at that time could not move from the hotel due to the lack of available options. PortConMaine in 2016 utilized space in The Maine Mall for gaming. The changes allowed for an expanded artists alley and panel space. PortConMaine 2020 was cancelled due to the COVID-19 pandemic. PortConMaine moved to the Holiday Inn By The Bay in Portland for 2026.

=== Event History ===
Dates	Location	Atten.	Guests
April 19–21, 2002	University of Southern Maine; Portland, Maine	250	John Andersen, Ian M. Clark, Bobby Kayetennae Crowwolf, David Foster, Christopher Gurney, Daniel Kevin Harrison, Scott A. Melzer, Jared A. Sorensen, and Ben Spaulding.
June 13–15, 2003	Best Western Inn: The Merry Manor; South Portland, Maine	400	Jason Amerkanian, Rae Bradbury-Enslin, Stephen K. Chenault, Ian M. Clark, Joe Digiorgi, Daniel Kevin Harrison, Alaina B. Karavitis, Jason Libby, Dave Lister, Truax McFarland, Matthew Pearson, Sidney C. Peters, Robert Quill, Jared A. Sorensen, Ben Spaulding, Ukyo, and Darren Watts.
June 18–20, 2004	Best Western Inn: The Merry Manor; South Portland, Maine	811	Jason Amerkanian, Chris Barrett, Allison Carmichael, Ian M. Clark, Joe Digiorgi, Nate Frisoli, Daniel Kevin Harrison, Sarah "Nami" Hevey, Sharon Lee, Jason Libby, Ian McConville, Jessica McLaughlin, Steve Miller, Robert Quill, Zev Shlasinger, Jared A. Sorensen, Vaz, and Jes Weigand.
June 24–26, 2005	Sheraton South Portland Hotel; South Portland, Maine	1,170	Kevin Brunelle, Brian Carroll, Drew Cass, Cat Dancer, Chris Drouin, Sean Edwards, Nate Frisoli, Mohammad "Hawk" Haque, Daniel Kevin Harrison, Nick Johnson, Alex Karantza, Dave Lister, Clayton McNally, Ananth Panagariya, Megan Phonesavanh, Peter Rimkunas, and Michael "Mookie" Terracciano.
June 30 – July 2, 2006	Sheraton South Portland Hotel; South Portland, Maine		Tom Brown, Drew Cass, Cat Dancer, Luci Christian, Jonathan Doughty, Chris Drouin, Lisa Furukawa, Shawn Handyside, Daniel Kevin Harrison, Chris Judd, Jon Knight, Jason Libby, Joe Miles, Theresa Pereira, Scott Ramsoomair, R.A. Salvatore, Jared A. Sorensen, Michael "Mookie" Terracciano, and Nathaniel Jay Alexander Wiley.
June 22–24, 2007	Sheraton South Portland Hotel; South Portland, Maine	1,663	Tom Brown, Svetlana Chmakova, J Dee DuPuy, Jessica Franklin, D.S. Gannon, Karen Gosselin, Garth Graham, Daniel Kevin Harrison, CJ Henderson, Erica Henderson, Elizabeth Jackson, Stacey Kardash, Jon Knight, Bettina M. Kurkoski, Dave Lister, Chris "Kilika" Malone, Mike McFarland, Joe Miles, Theresa Pereira, Michelle Pinard, A.E. Prevost, Robert "Sketch" Scholz, Michael Sinterniklaas, and Katy Ullman.
July 3–6, 2008	Eastland Park Hotel; Portland, Maine	1,650	Tom Brown, Garth Graham, Daniel Kevin Harrison, CJ Henderson, Erica Henderson, Elizabeth Jackson, Stacey Kardash, Jon Kneeland, Michele Knotz, Christian Matzke, Clayton McNally, Kori Michele, Randy Milholland, Mike Oxx, Michelle Pinard, Nicklaus Reichel, Bill Rogers, Robert "Sketch" Scholz, Christina Siravo, The Slants, Michael "Mookie" Terracciano, and Andi Wrede.
June 18–21, 2009	Wyndham Portland Airport Hotel; South Portland, Maine	1,804	4Player Podcast, Tom Brown, Garth Graham, Tiffany Grant, Daniel Kevin Harrison, CJ Henderson, The Hsu-nami, Samantha Inoue-Harte, Bettina M. Kurkoski, Christian Matzke, The Penny Dreadfuls, Denise Poirier, Robert "Sketch" Scholz, and Michael "Mookie" Terracciano.
June 24–27, 2010	Wyndham Portland Airport Hotel; South Portland, Maine	2,072	Tom Brown, Chris Cason, Geek Comedy Tour, CJ Henderson, Erica Henderson, Stanley Hollenbeck, Jon Kneeland, Christian Matzke, Luke Morgan, Mike Oxx, The Penny Dreadfuls, Robert Quill, Robert "Sketch" Scholz, Jared A. Sorensen, and Michael "Mookie" Terracciano.
June 23–26, 2011	Wyndham Portland Airport Hotel; South Portland, Maine	2,150	4-Player Co-Op, Christopher Ayres, Brian Brushwood, George Dalphin, Barry Dodd, Karen L. Dodd, Barry C. Fernandes, Daniel Kevin Harrison, Sharon Lee, The Mandalorian Mercs, Christian Matzke, Steve Miller, Luke Morgan, Elizabeth O'Malley, Robert "Sketch" Scholz, J. Michael Tatum, Michael "Mookie" Terracciano, Mort Todd, and Lex Winter.
June 21–24, 2012	DoubleTree by Hilton; South Portland, Maine	2,306	Ay-leen the Peacemaker, Sue Boisvert, Brian Brushwood, Lucretia Dearfour, Robin Lown Gardella, Ghostbusters, Kyle Hebert, Jim's Big Ego, Bryant Paul Johnson, The Mandalorian Mercs, Joel McDonald, Luke Morgan, nickelPUNK, Elizabeth O'Malley, Odaiko New England, Michael Peterson, Rachel Robichaud, Robert "Sketch" Scholz, and Lex Winter.
June 20–23, 2013	DoubleTree by Hilton; South Portland, Maine	2,502	4-Player Co-Op, Eric Anderson, Sue Boisvert, The Boston Sprockettes, Jeff Burgess, Chris Cason, Jeff Day, Keith R. A. DeCandido, Dorks in Dungeons, The East Kingdom, Shawn French, Nicolas Genovese, Ghostbusters, Mortimer Glum, Frederick Greenhalgh, Bethany Ingraham, Late Night Disaster, Julie Le Shane, Cherami Leigh, Maine, JL Major, The Mandalorian Mercs, Luke Morgan, Nuclear New England, Elizabeth O'Malley, Robert "Sketch" Scholz, Side Scrollers, and Lex Winter.
June 19–22, 2014	DoubleTree by Hilton; South Portland, Maine	2,634	Christopher Alcott, Dan Brian, Christine Marie Cabanos, Chamber Band, Crunk Witch, George Dalphin, Dark Follies, Dorks in Dungeons, Glenn Given, Savannah Houston-McIntyre, Stacey Kardash, The Mandalorian Mercs, Mary Bichner & Planetary Quartet, Meg McGinley-Crowe, Luke Morgan, Corinne Sudberg, Michael Tresca, Catherynne M. Valente, David Vincent, and Vivid Motion.
June 25–28, 2015	DoubleTree by Hilton; South Portland, Maine	3,219	3.5 Geeks, Eric Anderson, Barak Blackburn, Crunk Witch, The East Kingdom, Shawn French, Games by Play Date, Mortimer Glum, Ellie Hillis, Japan America Society of Maine, Sean Gordon Murphy, Amber Nash, Peeter Parkker, Keith Silverstein, and Lucky Yates.
June 23–26, 2016	DoubleTree by Hilton; South Portland, Maine	3,391	501st Legion, Brian Beacock, Barak Blackburn, Bill Brock, Jessica Calvello, Chuck Carter, Svetlana Chmakova, Julie Falatko, Ellie Hillis, Ross Kearney, The Mandalorian Mercs, Bill McLean, Gabby Nu, Odaiko New England, Rebel Legion, Carol Salemi, Lucas Schuneman, and Lex Winter.
June 22–25, 2017	DoubleTree by Hilton; South Portland, Maine	3,411	Michelle Delecki, Keith Giffen, KugoTheMighty, Myratheon, Alyson Leigh Rosenfeld, John Swasey, and Lara Woodhull.
June 21–24, 2018	DoubleTree by Hilton; South Portland, Maine	3,412	Alanaleilani Connolly, Tom Deschenes, Ryan North, Odaiko New England, Paul Pelletier, Aaron Roberts, Scott Sherman, and Mort Todd.
June 27–30, 2019	DoubleTree by Hilton; South Portland, Maine	3,602	Jessica Cavanagh, Leah Clark, Lauren Edinger, Reggie Groff, Andrea Parsneau, Pumpkadoodle, Josh Sparks, Austin Tindle, and Darren Watts.
June 24–27, 2021	DoubleTree by Hilton; South Portland, Maine	2,389	Bryn Apprill, Ryan Bartley, Becky Chambers, Sean Chiplock, Svetlana Chmakova, C. L. Clark, K.D. Edwards, Crystal Frasier, Justin Gary, Nicole Glover, TJ Klune, Michael Kovach, Krystal LaPorte, League of Larcy, Marissa Lenti, Melissa McCommon, Kayli Mills, Sarah Monette, Anairis Quiñones, Jonah Scott, Matt Shipman, Jonathan Sims, Society for Creative Anachronism, and Kc Wayland. (Note: All guests attended virtually.)
June 23–26, 2022	DoubleTree by Hilton; Maine Mall games arena South Portland, Maine	3,765	Jon Allen, T.M. Blanchet, Aaron Campbell, SL Choi, John Gremillion, Brittany Lauda, Molly Searcy, Matt Shipman, Paul St. Peter, Brandon Winckler, and Andrew Wojtal. (Note: Almost all guests attended virtually.)
June 22–25, 2023	DoubleTree by Hilton; South Portland, Maine	3,685	Paul Castro Jr., GaRuPoweR!!, Jeff Kline, Brianna Marie, Jason Massey, Seanan McGuire, Patrick Pedraza, and Kevin Urban.
June 27–30, 2024	DoubleTree by Hilton; South Portland, Maine	3,878	Jordan Dash Cruz, Kelsey Cruz, GaRuPoweR!!, Karina Gaz, Maarta Laiho, and Mallorie Rodak.
June 26-29, 2025	DoubleTree by Hilton; Maine Mall games arena South Portland, Maine	3,711	Natalie Rial, Ze'ev Shames, Joshua Spark, Jack Stansbury, and Teddy Bear Idols.
June 25-28, 2026	Holiday Inn Portland-By The Bay; Portland, Maine	4,000 (est.)	Sean Chiplock, Emily Louise, Heath Miller, Ify Nwadiwe, and Celeste Perez.
