= DC Arts and Humanities Education Collaborative =

The DC Arts and Humanities Education Collaborative is a non-profit organization dedicated to providing equitable access to arts education for all DC public and public charter schools for the growth of the whole child. The DC Collaborative believes that the arts—inclusive of music, visual arts, theater, dance and literary arts—are central to the education of every student. As a community-based partnership organization, almost 100 members strong, DCAHEC works with its partners to produce such exemplary programs as Arts for Every Student (AFES), Professional Development, and the recently launched Arts Education Initiative (AEI).

Members of the Collaborative include Adventure Theatre, Arena Stage, The Kennedy Center, the National Museum of African Art, The National Museum of Women in the Arts, the National Symphony Orchestra, Fords Theater, The Freer and Sackler Galleries and the Washington Bach Consort among many others. The Executive Director of the DC Collaborative was Louise Kennelly. In 2014, Lissa Rosenthal-Yoffe stepped into the role.

The DC Collaborative's Arts for Every Student program comprises both in school and out-of-school arts experiences, available to DC public and chartered school students without charge:

AFES at Cultural Institutions provides the DC public and chartered schools with access to age-appropriate cultural opportunities throughout the Washington Metropolitan area. The DC Collaborative's sponsorship ensures that under-served schools can benefit from the region's rich array of arts amenities. Excursions include storytelling presentations, music, dance and theater experiences including trips to the Kennedy Center and museums. These events connect to class-curriculum and help students develop critical-thinking skills. Participating organizations provide teachers with study materials, adding further incentive to integrate the arts into their daily lessons. In the 2008-2009 school year more than 33,000 students and teachers visited Cultural Institutions through AFES. Since 1998, the DC Collaborative has served 322,045 students and educators.

AFES In School is an alliance between the DC Collaborative and Washington Performing Arts Society's (WPAS) Concerts in Schools program. From WPAS's impressive roster, teachers can select "visiting artists" that perform free of charge. The live presentations, supporting workshops, and lecture/demonstrations enhance students' understanding of and appreciation for the arts and humanities. This on-site program also encourages teachers to incorporate cultural activities in the classroom more often.

== Professional Development ==
The Professional Development program is a key component of the DC Collaborative’s continuing education agenda for teachers, arts educators, and arts organization staff.

The DC Collaborative, in conjunction with member cultural organizations, offers workshops that focus on dance, visual arts, humanities, theater, and music. Each workshop highlights different topics within these disciplines. These workshops take place throughout the year at the hosting cultural organization.

In addition, the DC Collaborative offers in-school Professional Development Workshops. These site-based workshops support the DC Collaborative’s goal of helping teachers invigorate their classrooms through the arts. In-School professional development workshops are available by request and can either coincide with staff development days or take place during other approved times.

The DC Collaborative also offers content forums. Through frequent discussions and special workshops, the education staff of arts organizations learn about specifics of DCPS content standards, for example, and other curriculum requirements to be able to adapt their offerings to better meet classroom needs.

== Arts Education Initiative ==
In Spring 2005, the DC Collaborative launched the Arts Education Initiative (AEI), a multifaceted pilot project to establish a District-wide Arts Education Plan that includes arts experiences, arts learning, and arts integration. The DC Commission on the Arts and Humanities and the Ford Foundation serve as our founding partners for the AEI, and have provided generous funding for this endeavor. Through a comprehensive partnership with several DC public and chartered public schools, the DC Collaborative has developed, piloted, refined, and adopted a model process for collaboration in an urban school setting, to effect school change and enhance student learning. AEI enables collaborators, classroom teachers, school arts specialists, teaching artists, and cultural organizations to plan, lead, and evaluate each partner school's arts education programming more effectively. As a result, all schools involved in the AEI have greater access to equitable, high-quality arts education opportunities that support local learning standards and curriculum objectives.
