= Rowan College of South Jersey =

Public college in Sewell, New Jersey, US

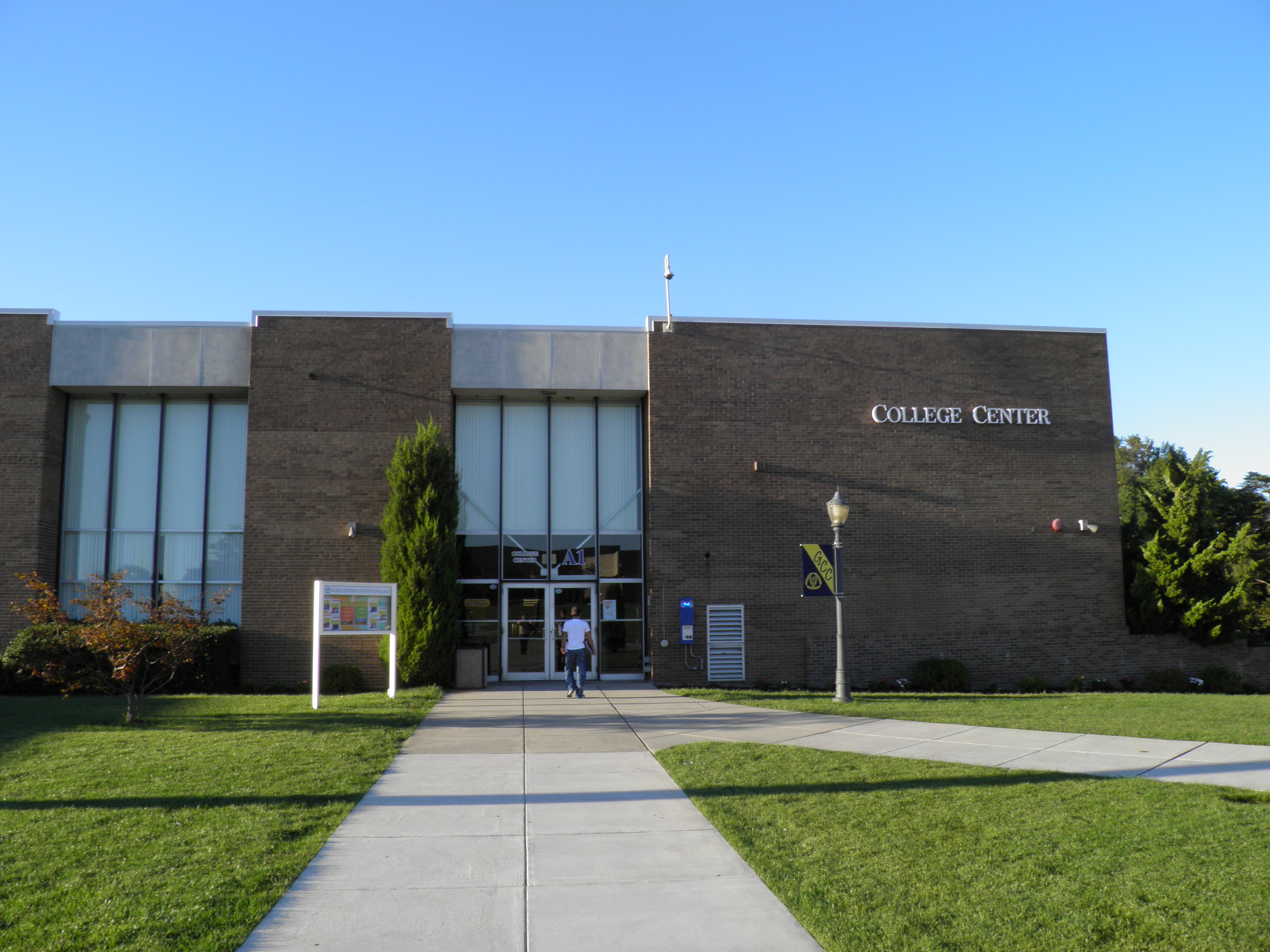
- Eugene J. McCaffrey Sr. College Center
- Former names: Rowan College at Gloucester County; Gloucester County College
- Motto: Two Campuses. One College. Greater Possibilities.
- Type: Public community college
- Established: September 1966
- Affiliations: NJCAA; AACC; GSAC
- Endowment: US$1,915,171 (RCGC Foundation) as of June 30, 2009
- Budget: US$39,388,473 as of 30 June 2009
- Chairman: Gene J. Concordia, Trustee
- President: Brenden Rickards, PhD (interim)
- Academic staff: 319 (247 adjunct professors; 77%) as of November 1, 2010
- Administrative staff: 392 (204 part-time), including student workers, as of November 1, 2010
- Students: 9,782
- Undergraduates: 6,609 (3,990 full-time) in 2010
- Other students: 3,173 (continuing education)
- Location: Sewell and Vineland, New Jersey, United States; 39.7810°N 75.1212°W
- Campus: Suburban
- Colors: Blue and gold
- Nicknames: Roadrunners (Gloucester Campus) and Dukes (Cumberland Campus)
- Mascot: Roadrunner
- Website: rcsj.edu
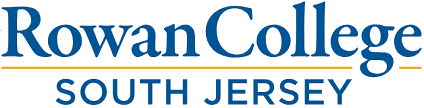

Rowan College of South Jersey (RCSJ) is a public community college with two campuses in the South Jersey region of New Jersey. The first, Gloucester Main Campus, is in Sewell. The second, Cumberland Branch Campus, is in both Vineland and Millville. The college was established in 1966 as "Gloucester County College" (GCC). In 2014, the college changed its name to "Rowan College of Gloucester County" when Rowan University and Gloucester County College entered into a partnership. The college then expanded in 2019, combining Rowan College at Gloucester County (RCGC) and Cumberland County College to become Rowan College of South Jersey.

The college now offers conditional dual enrollment with Rowan University depending on GPA. While then GCC took the Rowan name, the community college maintains its independence with its own Board of Trustees and administration.

RCSJ has articulation and credit transfer agreements with many area and online colleges and universities, and several dual enrollment agreements. Academic areas include Nursing and Allied Health, an area with selective admissions, unlike most other programs, Gloucester County's Police Academy and related degrees, and continuing education.

As of February 2012, RCSJ has about 266 acres (1.1 km^{2}) of grounds on the main Gloucester Campus with twelve buildings, two of which Gloucester County organizational headquarters. It has an art gallery, a walking and jogging trail, and community gardens. Student life at the college includes KotoriCon, an anime convention, as well as many other activities.

== History ==
Gloucester County voters passed a non-binding referendum in 1965, calling for the Board of Chosen Freeholders to start a community college in the county. Gloucester County College was established in 1966, when the New Jersey Department of Education approved its charter.

=== Buildings ===
The first classes were taught in the summer of 1967 at Monongahela Middle School and Deptford Township High School. The first building owned by RCSJ was the Instructional Center, which was completed in 1970. The first classes were taught there in the fall of that year. Other past building projects include the College Center (opened in January 1971), the Library (dedicated in October 1988), the Health Sciences building and the Police Academy (begun in 1993), and Scott Hall, which houses the chemistry and biology classrooms and laboratories (began in 2001 and dedicated in September 2002).

=== Presidents ===
==== 20th century ====
The college's first president, William L. Apetz, began his tenure in September 1966. He retired from RCGC in 1980 and went on to be the first president of Sussex County Community College, another County College in New Jersey.

The second president was Gary L. Reddig, who was appointed in July 1980 and resigned on October 31, 1986, giving two reasons. First, he wished to assume the position of director of the County Community College Presidents Association of New Jersey. Second, he alleged that the then chair of the board of trustees, Richard J. Ambacher, Jr. (later a professor emeritus of Rowan University), had pressured him to get Ambacher's son a custodial job at the college and his daughter-in-law into the nursing program, which has selective admissions; he also claimed that Ambacher had otherwise interfered in college operations. Ambacher denied the allegations, and stated that he had only asked that the nursing program's admissions standards be altered to avoid bias against non-traditional students. One trustee resigned in sympathy with Reddig. A state investigation resulted in a report and letter recommending that the relationship between the board of trustees and the school be changed (including requiring the college president's approval for hiring done by the board), that trustee quorum requirements be increased, and that trustee training and selection be improved. The investigation did not find Reddig's allegations correct. One member of the Board of Chosen Freeholders asked for Ambacher's term as a trustee not to be renewed; Ambacher responded that this was a political maneuver in the context of an upcoming election. Ambacher did not seek another term as trustee after his existing term ended in November 1987, stating that this was for health reasons (diabetes exacerbated by stress). There was considerable dismay at RCGC over these events, especially with accreditation renewal coming in spring 1987.

On October 4, 1987, Richard H. Jones became its third president, serving until his retirement on February 1, 1998. He had been a vice-president at RCGC, then acting president after Reddig's departure.

The fourth president was Gail O. Mellow, who was selected prior to Jones' retirement and worked with him from November 1, 1997, until his retirement.

==== 21st century ====
Mellow served as president until she left to become president of LaGuardia Community College on August 1, 2000.

The fifth president was William F. Anderson, who had previously served as vice president, then as interim president. He resigned in July 2007, but stayed with RCGC as the food science program administrator.

Russell A. Davis was the sixth president from September 2008 until his resignation on April 13, 2011. He had earlier been vice president of student services, then acting president after Anderson's resignation. On April 29, 2011, Davis was charged with eleven counts of forgery of a signature to obtain loans from his pension/retirement account (similar to the loans allowed from a 401(k)); the prosecutor's office has not accused Davis of theft of college property.

In February 2012, Frederick Keating, who had been serving as interim president, was named the seventh president. He was previously RCSJ's vice president of student services and before that superintendent at the Gloucester County Institute of Technology (GCIT). During his tenure Keating focused on expanding RCSJ’s presence within the South Jersey region, integrating the Gloucester and Cumberland campuses more, establishing several corporate partnerships, and expanding degree opportunities. Keating retired in the summer of 2025, and was succeeded by interim president Brenden Rickards.

=== Problematic periods ===
There has been tension between faculty and administration on two occasions: a strike was threatened in 1989 over pay; further tension in 2002 was settled largely by Lalaji S. Deshbandhu, the late president of the RCSJ Faculty Association.

RCSJ's nursing program had difficulties in 1997–98, with lower pass rates (78% in 1998, and below 80% in 1997) on state examinations for nursing qualifications. These led to it being put on probation by the state. Changes made that elevated the pass rate to 93% for May–September 1999, taking the school from the bottom 20% of two-year nursing programs to the top 25%.

In 2008, the workweek was cut to four days during the summer, more buildings were closed during breaks, and there was increased scrutiny of purchases. RCSJ (including RCSJ Foundation) investment revenue went from $636,391 per year in 2007 to $202,805 per year in 2009.

== Organization and administration ==
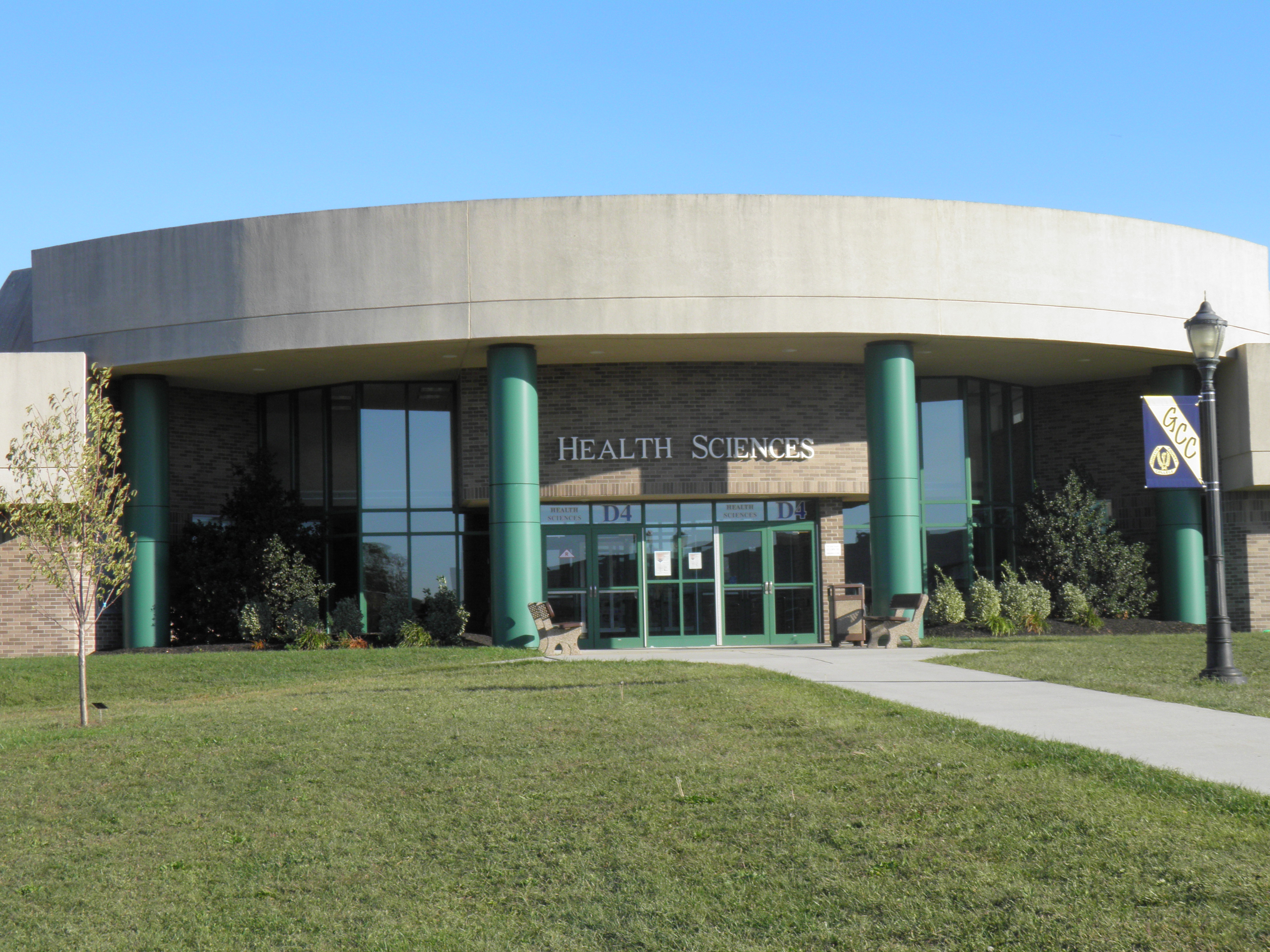
RCGC's Health Sciences Building

The college's governing body is the board of trustees. Eight trustees are appointed by the Gloucester County Administrator and Board of Chosen Freeholders; two are appointed by the governor of New Jersey; the eleventh trustee is the county Superintendent of Schools, a voting ex officio member; and the college president is a non-voting ex officio member.

RCGC's annual budget in 2009 was $39,388,473. The college is financially dependent primarily on money from Gloucester County and the State of New Jersey (about 49.1% of revenue in 2009), followed by funds from student tuition and fees (about 35.2% of revenue in 2009).

The RCGC Foundation holds the college's endowment ($4,761,853 as of 31 December 2018). Most income from the endowment is used to provide scholarships.

The academic divisions of RCGC are:

- Division of Allied Health and Nursing
- Division of Business Studies
- Division of Health, Physical Education and Recreation (also includes Exercise Science)
- Division of Liberal Arts
- Division of Public Safety and Security (Criminal Justice and Law Enforcement)
- Division of Science, Technology, Engineering and Mathematics (STEM)
- Other Areas (including continuing education, some certificate programs, the Police Academy, and the Fire Academy)

Articulation and credit transfer agreements exist with 27 area or online four-year colleges and universities. These include Rowan University, Fairleigh Dickinson University, Wilmington University, Temple University, Penn State University, the University of Maryland University College (UMUC), Thomas Edison State College, Drexel University, and Rutgers University. RCGC offers dual enrollment with Rowan, Fairleigh Dickinson, Wilmington, and UMUC (generally only for some programs and majors). Stephen M. Sweeney, President of the New Jersey Senate, has called for other community colleges in South Jersey to follow RCGC in having dual enrollment agreements with Rowan.

== Academics ==
=== Admissions ===
Most of RCGC's programs are open to anyone with a high school diploma or GED; some opportunities to take for-credit courses are available to high school students and others. (RCGC has links with the Gloucester County Institute of Technology (GCIT) and, to a lesser degree, with other high schools in the county.) There are, however, selective admissions for Nursing, Allied Health, and Automotive Technology.

=== Enrollment and demographics ===
The college awarded 819 associate degrees and 15 academic certificates in 2009–2010. Of the 1561 first-time, full-time students starting in 2007, 350 had graduated with associate degrees and 351 transferred (for example, to a four-year college or university) by 2010. The total percentage of 44.9% was the third highest among the nineteen New Jersey County Colleges (NJCCs); the median was 35.3%. Among all students in 2010, the percentage enrolled in remedial courses was 28.9% (seventh among the nineteen NJCCs; the median is 28.1%); among first-time, full-time students, the percentage was 63.3% (tenth among the nineteen NJCCs; the median is 63.3%). Enrollment in for-credit courses was 6,609 in 2010; of these, 1,557 (about 23.6%) were first-time, full-time students, and altogether 60% were full-time. 33.5% of RCGC's students in 2010 were between 18 and 21 (48.5% of full-time students and 10.6% of part-time students). In 2010, about 17% of RCGC's students came from outside Gloucester County; 99.5% were from New Jersey. In 2011, 170 of RCGC's students were veterans; On G.I. Jobs magazine's 2012 list of Military Friendly Schools, and on two lists from previous years, RCGC was ranked in the top 15% of universities, colleges, and trade schools nationwide for enrolling veterans as students.

Adjunct professors make up about 77.4% of the faculty. About 61.8% of course sections are taught by adjuncts or staff members rather than full-time faculty. RCGC ranks ninth out of the nineteen NJCCs in the proportion of course sections not taught by full-time faculty; the median is 60%.

=== Tuition/fees and financial aid ===
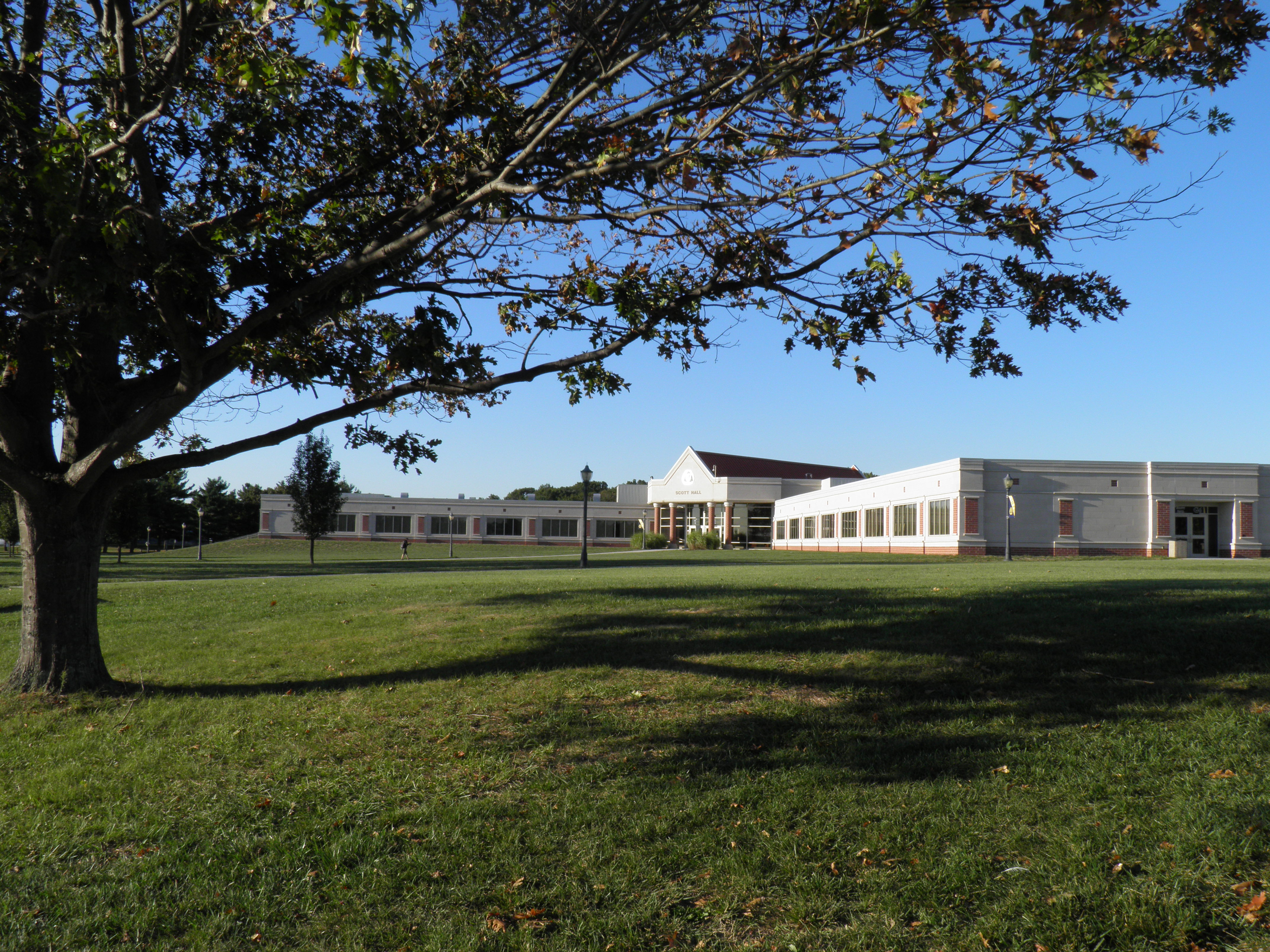
RCGC's Scott Hall, known as the Virginia N. Scott Center for Science and Technology, houses the college's biology and chemistry labs.

Tuition and fees^{*} at RCSJ are lowest for Gloucester County and Cumberland County residents, intermediate for other New Jersey residents, and highest for others. In this, the college follows the way other county colleges in New Jersey favor their counties or pairs of counties. The total of tuition plus fees for in-state but out-of-county full-time students at RCSJ in 2011–2012 was less than the in-county rates charged by all but three other county colleges in New Jersey. The same was true of part-time (twelve credits per year) rates, compared with those of all but two other county colleges in New Jersey.

Over 40% of students entering RCGC in 2010 received some form of financial aid. The most common source was a federally funded Pell Grant, received by about 34% of students. Approximately 1% received financial aid from the RCGC Foundation in 2010.

=== Accreditation and programs ===
Gloucester County College is accredited by the Middle States Association of Colleges and Schools' Commission on Higher Education. Some programs at RCGC are also accredited by other agencies. These include:

- Nursing (including RN and LPN to RN, with an Associate of Science in Nursing) accredited by the New Jersey Board of Nursing and the National League for Nursing Accrediting Commission (NLNAC);
- Diagnostic Medical Sonography, accredited by the Commission on Accreditation of Allied Health Education Programs;
- Nuclear Medicine Technology, accredited by the Joint Review Committee on Educational Programs in Nuclear Medicine Technology;
- Paralegal degree and certificate programs, accredited by the American Bar Association Standing Committee on Legal Assistants.

RCGC also includes the Gloucester County Police Academy, and associate degrees in Law Enforcement and Criminal Justice are available. The Dean of the Police Academy is Fred H. Madden, who is also a New Jersey State Senator. (Such dual office-holding has been questioned by Chris Christie, Governor of New Jersey.)

Nursing and Allied health professions includes respiratory therapy, partially through cooperation with the University of Medicine and Dentistry of New Jersey. Nursing and Allied Health are areas in which RCGC operates selective admissions.

In its 2010 survey, Community College Week ranked RCGC 9th nationwide in the number of associate degrees awarded to education majors and 35th nationwide in the number of associate degrees awarded in parks, recreation, leisure, and fitness studies.

As well as face-to-face education, distance learning and hybrid (blended) distance and face-to-face learning are available for some courses using the Blackboard system.

In fall 2010, the top ten programs by numbers enrolled were:

1. Associate of Arts in Arts & Sciences (general; meant for transfer)
2. Associate of Science in Business administration
3. Associate of Arts in Education
4. Associate of Arts & Sciences in Criminal justice
5. Associate of Arts in Psychology
6. Associate of Applied Science in Law enforcement
7. Associate of Science in Arts & Sciences (general; meant for transfer)
8. Associate of Science in Biology
9. Associate of Science in Nursing (selective admissions)
10. Associate of Science in Exercise science

=== Academic calendar ===
RCGC uses a modified semester system. It has fall and spring semesters together with shorter winter and summer terms; the latter are further broken up into overlapping sessions of variable lengths (five weeks at the most for the winter term). A higher proportion of the winter and summer courses are blended/hybrid or distance education. As well as weekdays (including late afternoon and evening), courses are offered on Saturdays and Sundays.

=== Continuing education ===
Registration for continuing education courses totaled 35,773 in 2009, counting each course separately. A survey conducted by South Jersey Biz named RCGC "Best of Biz 2011" in the professional development category for its computerized office administration, network management, accounting, web development, and information technology programs.

RCGC offers subsidized ($25 or less registration fee and no class fee) courses to local residents in areas such as English as a Second Language, Adult Basic Education, and GED test preparation. It offers free classes in basic computer skills to employees of local businesses, in health information technology for a limited number of students, and in logistics. As with for-credit courses, GCC has traditional in-person, hybrid/blended, and purely online continuing education courses.

== Campus ==
RCGC is close to Route 47 (1.1 miles or 1.8 kilometers away by car) and Route 55 (1.4 miles or 2.3 kilometers away by car). It is 4.7 miles (7.6 km) from Woodbury (Gloucester County's county seat), 5.0 miles (8.0 km) from Washington Township (Gloucester County's largest municipality), 11.9 miles (19.2 km) from Camden, New Jersey, and 15.9 miles (25.6 km) from Philadelphia, Pennsylvania. It has a bus stop that is on New Jersey Transit bus routes 408 and 463.

=== Buildings and usage ===
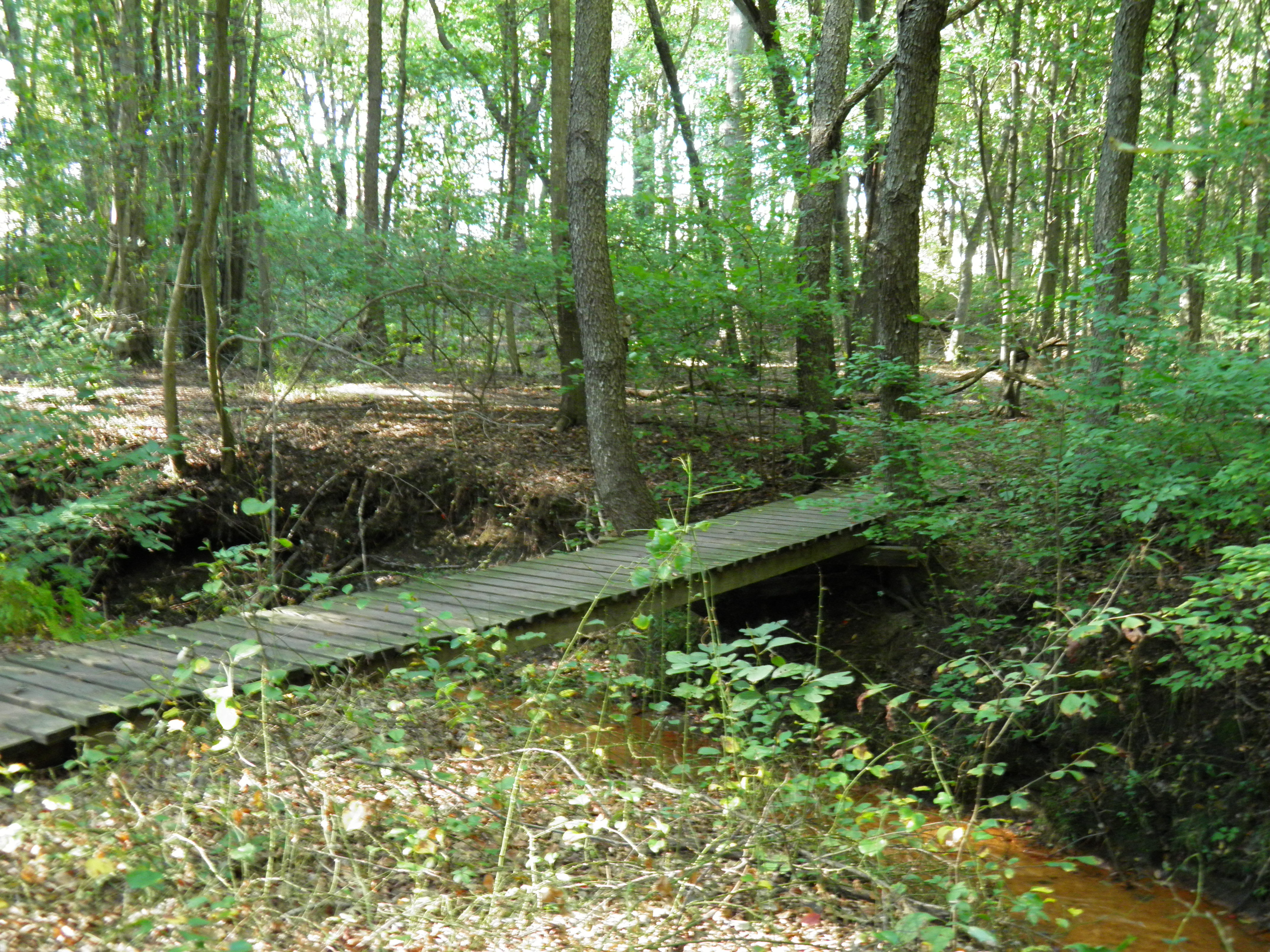
RCGC's trail

RCGC's Gloucester campus of about 266 acres (1.1 km^{2}) has twelve buildings as of February 2012; all are accessible by wheelchair. A 30,000 sq ft (3,000 m^{2}) University Center building is under construction. It is planned to use it from the fall of 2012 for RCGC classes in the daytime and dual enrollment undergraduate and graduate classes at night. Other buildings include Scott Hall, the Eugene J. McCaffrey, Sr. College Center, the Library, and the Early Childhood Education Center, which offers daycare services for children aged 2 1/2–5 to students, faculty, staff, alumni, and Gloucester County residents. The entire campus is non-smoking except for specifically designated areas.

Some other Gloucester County organizations are headquartered at RCGC. The Gloucester County Community Service Corps (a branch of the Senior Corps) and the Volunteer Center of Gloucester County are in the Instructional Center building, In the College Center building there is the Center for People in Transition, a Displaced Homemaker program from the New Jersey Department of Community Affairs' Division on Women that serves former homemakers who have lost that role through bereavement, divorce, or other separation from a money-providing spouse. The center concentrates on women, and it is not clear whether a former househusband would be eligible. A number of its services, such as some of its workshops, are not restricted to displaced homemakers. When funding is available, the center also provides services to military spouses whose partners are overseas in Iraq or Afghanistan.

Inside the Gloucester College Center building is the Dr. Ross Beitzel Art Gallery, with a permanent collection valued at over $250,000. It is on display both in the gallery and throughout the campus and is the longest-running art exhibit among community colleges in New Jersey. Art exhibitions are sometimes held there.

The Cumberland Campus is divided between the city limits of Vineland and Millville.

=== Grounds ===
The grounds are part of the Gloucester County Educational Campus (GCEC), which also includes GCIT's campus. RCGC's campus includes over 5-mile (8.0 km) of walking and jogging trail (available for use by visitors as well as students, faculty, and staff) that goes through part of the forested area of the campus; it has 76 trail markers, for which GPS coordinates are available, and a map of the college course at an entrance to the trail.

The grounds are also used for the Community Gardens project, which started in 1973 and allows county residents to rent small plots of RCGC land to raise vegetables, flowers, and other plants. The rental money goes to the RCGC Foundation to help provide scholarships.

=== Off-campus sites ===
Two portions of RCGC are located off of the main campus. The first is the automotive technology program, most of which is located on the neighboring Gloucester Institute of Technology campus as part of the cooperation between RCGC and GCIT, with the additional involvement of the Ford Motor Company; it includes both classroom courses (some taken at RCGC's main campus) and paid internships. The second is the Gloucester County Fire Academy, located in Clarksboro, New Jersey.

== Student life ==
Services for RCGC students include free short-term psychological counseling; on the counseling staff is a licensed clinical psychologist. The Student Assistance Center also provides workshops on topics such as stress management.

=== Student organizations ===
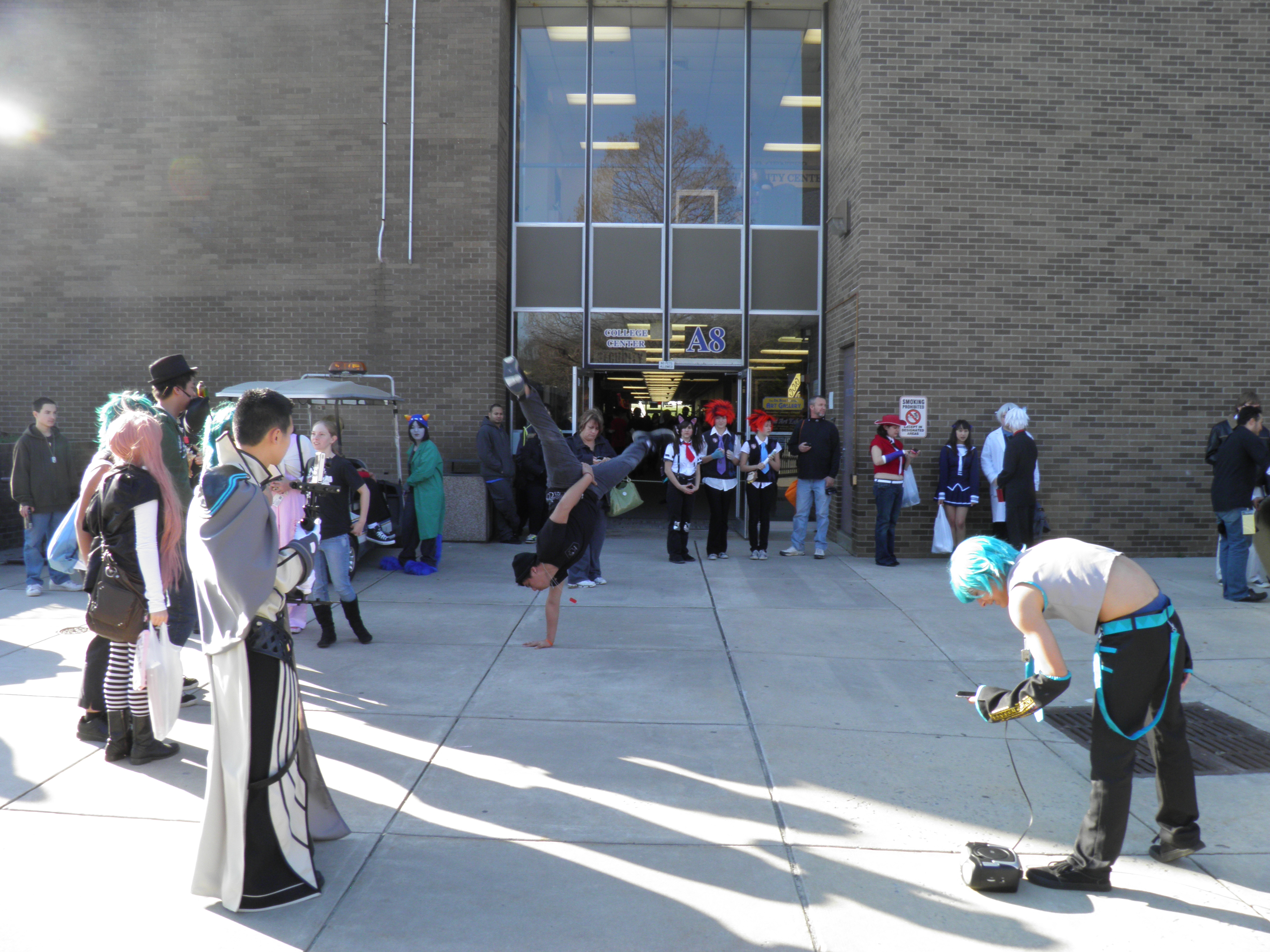
People at KotoriCon in front of the College Center

The Student Government Association, together with its advisor, distributes funding to other student organizations. RCGC has an active local chapter (Alpha Psi Pi) of the Phi Theta Kappa International Honor Society. Also active are the Student Veterans Organization, the Vanguard Fine Arts Club, and many other student clubs.

=== KotoriCon ===
One of the active student clubs at RCGC is the Japanese Anime Guild (JAG). They have held an annual anime convention called KotoriCon since January 2010. In addition to anime, KotoriCon includes video game tournaments, panels (with voice actors, for instance), cosplay events and competitions, Japanese swordplay and other martial arts demonstrations, Jedi events, music video contests, a charity auction, comedians, origami displays, concerts, and Japanese dance contests. The JAG Club sponsored a concert by Shonen Knife on 23 October 2011 as a prelude to KotoriCon.

=== Athletics ===
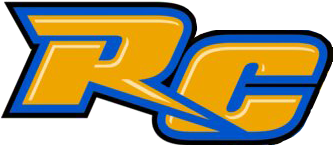
RCSJ athletics wordmark

The college's sports teams, known as the Roadrunners, have earned five NATYCAA (National Association of Two-Year College Athletic Administrators) Cups for the best overall non-scholarship two-year college in the nation, and thirty national championships in National Junior College Athletic Association (NJCAA) Division III. The Roadrunners compete in NJCAA Region XIX and are members of the Garden State Athletic Conference.

The college now offers 16 sports: Baseball Basketball (Men's) Basketball (Women's) Cross Country (Men's & Women's) Soccer (Men's) Soccer (Women's) Golf (Men's) Softball Tennis (Men's) Tennis (Women's) Track & Field (Men's & Women's) Volleyball (Women's) Wrestling Golf (Women's)

National championships were won by these teams:

- Men's Basketball – 1994
- Baseball – 1992, 1993, 1999, 2000, 2005, 2010, 2013
- Wrestling – 1996, 1998, 1999, 2000, 2002, 2007
- Women's Cross Country – 2006, 2012
- Men's Cross Country – 1995
- Men's Tennis – 2010, 2011, 2012, 2013
- Softball – 2011, 2012
- Women's Tennis - 2012, 2013, 2014
- Men's Track & Field - 2014, 2018, 2019
- Women's Track & Field - 2013

Website for Athletics is www.RCRoadrunners.com.

== Notable alumni ==
- Carmelo Marrero - wrestler; professional mixed martial arts fighter
- Nick Comoroto - professional wrestler

== Notes ==
*Together with the costs of books, supplies, and transportation, this is the cost of attendance or "sticker price".
