= Rolf Deyhle =

German property developer and film producer (1938–2014)

- Born: 3 October 1938; Stuttgart, Germany
- Died: 2 May 2014 (aged 75); Badenweiler, Germany
- Occupations: Property developer and film producer
- Known for: Art collector
- Children: 6

Rolf Deyhle (3 October 1938 – 2 May 2014) was a German property developer, art collector and film producer. In September 1992 Deyhle was listed by Fortune as having a combined wealth of US$1.1 billion.

Deyhle designed the FIFA logo in 1977 and subsequently obtained the marketing rights to all FIFA-related signs, symbols and designs until the 1994 World Cup in the United States, against the wishes of the then-FIFA president, João Havelange.

Deyhle owned Stella AG, the German theatre production company that also owned theatres in Hamburg. In 1997, it employed 4,500 people, claimed to be the market leader in the German musical sector, and was due to float 49% on the German stock market. Stella AG eventually became insolvent and was taken over in 2001 by Stage Entertainment.

Deyhle died on May 2, 2014, and was survived by a wife and six children.
