= Pets for Vets =

US non-profit organization

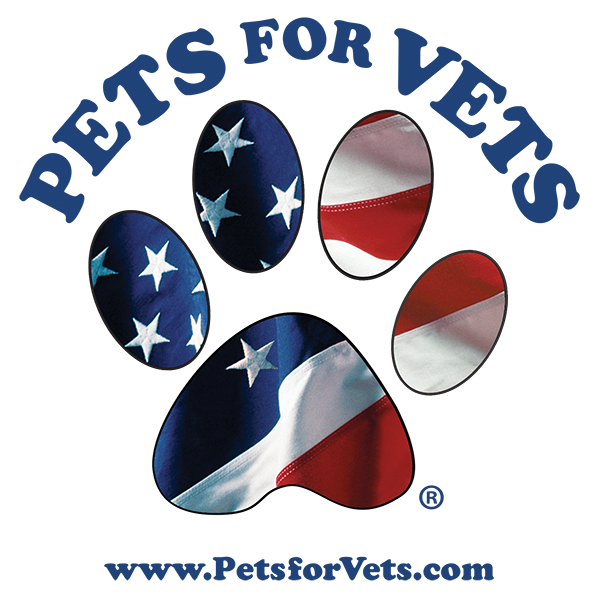
- Founder: Clarissa Black
- Type: 501(c)(3)
- Tax ID no.: 27-1250302
- Purpose: We enrich the lives of Veterans by creating a life changing Super Bond® with expertly selected and trained shelter or rescue pets and providing ongoing expert support to ensure a reciprocal and thriving partnership at no cost to the Veteran. We are committed to engaging and recruiting trainers, fostering a collaborative community committed to continuing education, and sharing our innovative approach to Human-Animal Bond Assisted Interventions. By continually increasing the pool of expert trainers our program expands making a greater impact in Veteran and animal communities which leads towards a world where every Veteran receives the support they deserve.
- Revenue: $1,284,387
- Expenses: $426,401 (2015)
- Website: www.petsforvets.com

Pets for Vets is a 501(c)(3) non-profit organization in the United States dedicated to providing a second chance to shelter animals by rescuing, training, and matching them with American veterans who need a companion pet. It was founded in 2009 to help veterans who were suffering from combat stress and other emotional challenges. Each companion animal is rescued in connection with local animal rescue organizations.

== History ==
Pets for Vets was founded on October 21, 2009, by animal behaviorist and trainer Clarissa Black, who was looking for a way to help American veterans who had combat stress and other emotional challenges related to their service. Many veterans experience physical and emotional injuries making it difficult to transition back to civilian life. Pets for Vets helps military veterans reclaim normalcy in their lives through companion animals.

Most of the animals paired with veterans are dogs, though cats, bunnies, and birds have also been matched. Each companion dog is rescued in connection with local animal rescue organizations. They are then given basic obedience training and any additional training that will help them assimilate into their new lives and then finally placed in their Veterans home. The program is built on the principles of positive reinforcement training, as this approach is the most effective in fostering trust, confidence, and connection between the animals and the Veterans.

== Issues addressed ==
Estimates that anywhere from one in eight to one in five of all Iraq war veterans have some degree of PTSD and two-thirds of those who screened positive for PTSD are not receiving treatment. People who have PTSD experience anxiety, depression, sleeplessness, flashbacks, and extreme wariness. It may manifest right away or show up months or even years later. Some of those who have PTSD commit suicide.

According to the ASPCA, every year between 6 and 8 million dogs and cats are abandoned at shelters in the United States. Nationally five out of ten shelter dogs and seven out of ten shelter cats are euthanized because there is no one to adopt them from the shelter. These dogs and cats can make excellent companion animals but never have that chance.

== Companion animals as therapy ==
Animal-assisted therapy has typically been used to treat physical disabilities; it is becoming increasingly useful in treating patients with psychological complications including PTSD and combat stress and even reducing symptoms of PTSD in as many as 82% of patients studied.

More and more veterans are being written prescriptions for companion animals to help combat PTSD. Pets can help alleviate stress, loneliness and anxiety. The Centers for Disease Control and Prevention says pets can decrease a person's blood pressure, cholesterol levels, triglyceride levels and feelings of loneliness. Pets can increase opportunities for exercise and outdoor activities and opportunities for socialization. Caring for a pet encourages responsibility and adherence to a daily schedule.

Pets for Vets developed a program focusing on addressing these issues by bringing together animals needing to be rescued and veterans needing a companion for a better quality of life. Not every veteran qualifies for a psychiatric service dog; however, everyone who wants one can benefit from a companion or pet animal.

== See also ==
- Pet adoption
- Human-animal bonding
- P.A.W.S.
