= The Hsu-nami =

American progressive rock band

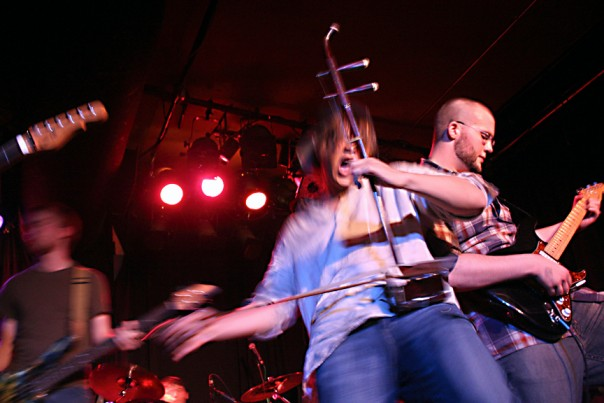
- Hsu-nami performing at Lion's Den

Background information
- Origin: Mahwah, New Jersey, U.S.
- Genres: Post-rock; Instrumental rock Progressive rock Chinese Traditional
- Years active: 2005–present
- Labels: Big Lucky 大吉祥 (Taiwan Label), Po Records (2006–2007), Pacifiction Records
- Members: Jack Hsu; Brent Bergholm; Derril Sellers; John Manna; Dana Goldberg
- Past members: Tony Aichele; Vinny Belcastro; Adam Toth
- Website: http://www.Hsu-nami.com

The Hsu-nami is an American progressive rock band from the United States. The Hsu-nami, named after the frontman Jack Hsu, became known as the first "Progressive Erhu Rock" band in the world.

The Hsu-nami integrates an amplified "erhu", a two-string spike fiddle used in Chinese classical and folk music, into an instrumental progressive rock sound.

== History ==
The group was formed in 2005 from the remnants of the acoustic Duo "Genso Fantasia" and power metal outfit "Bleed the Stone". The members met in the musical circle of Ramapo College of New Jersey. The name Hsu-nami was derived from the nickname of frontman Jack Hsu. Their touring career started at the momentous last night of CBGB's, and has included opening for international acts such as ChthoniC, Yellowcard, Nightmare of You, The Parlor Mob, World Leader Pretend, and Jet Lag Gemini. Hsu-nami's original rhythm guitarist, Vinny Belcastro left the band to form pop rock band "Fifteen Fleeting" in the spring of 2008. Tony Aichele Hsu-nami's 2nd rhythm guitarist also left the band after 3 years for work related reasons in the summer of 2011.

The band's first successful song was "Rising of the Sun." It was featured in the 2008 Summer Olympic in Beijing. It was used specifically as the entrance theme for the Chinese Basketball team. The song was also used during walk-ins, timeouts, and was incorporated with a martial arts routine during halftime.

In November 2008, Hsu-nami was featured on the MTV IGGY show "Radar", a television show that features up and coming world music artists. It aired on MTV 2, MTV U, MTV Australia, MTV Hong Kong, and many others.

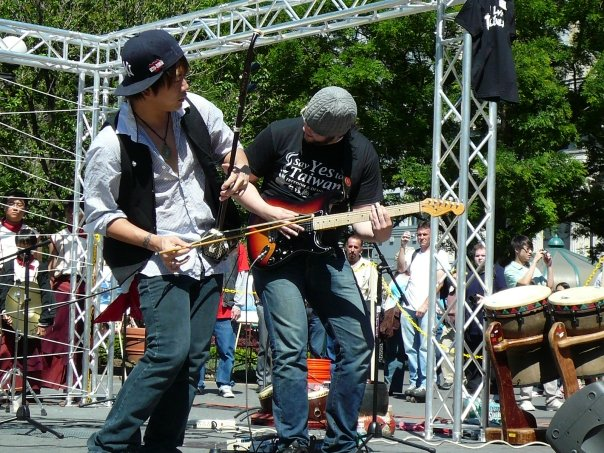
Hsu-nami Performing at Union Square New York City (June 2008)

The Hsu-nami performed internationally. Touring the whole country of Taiwan starting from the famous Spring Scream festival in Kenting to Kaoshung, Taichung & Taipei in April 2011. In October of the same year they toured Shanghai and Beijing, China to perform at the modern sky Strawberry Music festival. Other festivals they performed are Taiwan Fest held at the Toronto Harbor Front Centre, Vancouver's Plaza of Nations, Coalition of Asian Pacific Americans Festival (CAPA Fest), the Passport 2 Taiwan Festival at Union Square NYC, and the Asian Film Festival (ACV/AAIFF). The Hsu-nami has also played at many conventions including: Tekkoshocon (Pittsburgh, PA), Anime Punch Armageddicon (Columbus, Ohio), Another Anime Convention (Nashua, New Hampshire), Tandokucon, Zenkaikon (the Philadelphia area), PortConMaine (Portland, Maine) and Sakura-Con (Seattle, Washington).

The group has headlined many clubs and venues such as the playing New York's Citi Field (cap. 42, 000/est. 235 att), Times Square. Brooklyn Bowl (Brooklyn, NY), Highline Ballroom (Manhattan, NY), Harry Chapin Lakeside Theatre (East Meadow, NY), CBGB in (Manhattan, NY), Stone Pony (Asbury Park NJ), the Mexicali Blues Cafe (Teaneck, NJ), the Trocadero Theatre (Philadelphia, PA) and for Chinese label Modern Sky's "China Night" at NYC's CMJ festival 2010.

The band also support a lot of charity performed for organizations such as Ronald McDonald House. and also organize their own charity concerts in 2009 they raise money for Typhoon Morakot victims and in 2011 they raised money for Japan earthquake and tsunami victims.

=== Entering the Mandala ===
The Hsu-nami's first album, "Entering the Mandala" was named after the closing track of the CD. The song was inspired by the Tibetan Buddhist belief in the quest for the highest level of enlightenment.

The first track of the CD, titled "Rising of the Sun", was featured in the 2008 Summer Olympics in Beijing representing the 2008 Chinese Basketball Team.

Jim Beckerman from The Bergen Record wrote a feature published 08/10/08 regarding the Hsu-nami's music feature in the Beijing Summer Olympics. When the story was picked up by the Associated Press, Hsu-nami instantly received national coverage from media outlets such as WCBS 880, 1010 wins, Fort Mill Times, NJ.com, Philly.com, redorbit.com, spokesmanreview.com, NBC sports, USA Today, International Herald Tribune (the global edition of the New York Times).

Because Hsu-nami's Music represented the Chinese basketball team and Front man Jack Hsu is Taiwanese-American, the Taiwan Organization in New York did not warmly congratulate the band for its success, due to the issue of Taiwan independence and cross-strait relations, as well as Taiwan's status in the IOC as Chinese Taipei. In an interview on MuchMusic, Jack Hsu was quoted, "The struggles suffered by the Taiwanese people are, of course, terrible, but that's only if you truly believe any of those conflicts occurred in the first place. The past is past. I look forward and have no problem with China especially when they want one of our songs!"

=== The Four Noble Truths ===
The band released their 2nd album, "The Four Noble Truths" 24 March 2009, named after the 10:35 long song on the CD. The meaning of the song delves deeper into the theme behind "Entering the Mandala". It attempts to illustrate The Four Noble Truths, especially the idea that the quest for enlightenment starts with pain, sickness, injury, tiredness, old age, death, sadness, fear, frustration, disappointment, and depression.

The songs on the 2nd album were also inspired by different occurrences in the band members' lives. In an interview with Chinese World Journal, Jack mentioned "The new album song title 'Passport to Taiwan' is a medley of 'dark sky', 'throw pen' and 'missing spring wind' (3 Taiwanese popular Traditional Tunes) rearranged from traditional to the raw hard rock/punk rock style." The song 'Luxy NYE' was inspired by Hsu's visit to Taipei, Taiwan celebrating New Year's feeling.

The Hsu-nami's lineup underwent one change during the time between "Entering the Mandala" and "the Four Noble Truths". This explains why the track "Moonlight" features Adam Toth on piano while keys for the rest of the album are played by Dana Goldberg, a new arrival to The Hsu-nami in 2009.

In December 2011 the album were released by Big Lucky DGS 大吉祥 (Taiwan Label), for Taiwan release.

Jack was also quoted "comparable to death metal band Chthonic (also from Taiwan), The Hsu-nami want to put out a message of peace and friendship, shying away from the Political and negative perspectives." However, while Chthonic is an outspoken supporter for Taiwanese Independence, Jack Hsu was quoted as saying "I don’t give a shit about any political drama there. It just splits the Taiwanese people apart."

=== Hsu-nami ===
The band release their self-titled 3rd album, "Hsu-nami" 30 June 2016. It is a 10 track concept album with the themes of Chinese constellations. The album features many talented guest musicians and arrangers based in New York city. With instruments such as Pipa, (Chinese Plucking instrument) Shamisen, (Japanese Guitar) Shakuhachi (Japanese flute) and an entire live orchestra recording feature in the album, with strings arranged and produced by Costa Rican Andres Marin.

== Members ==
=== Current ===
- Jack Hsu – erhu, violin (2005–present)
- Brent Bergholm – guitar (2005–present)
- Derril Sellers – bass (2005–present)
- John Manna – drum set (2005–present)
- Dana Goldberg – keys (2009–present)

=== Former ===
- Tony Aichele rhythm guitar (2008–2011)
- Vinny Belcastro – rhythm guitar (2005–2007)
- Adam Toth – Keys (2005–2008)

=== Guest Performer/Arranger ===
- Andres Marin – String arranger and production on the track "Reincarnation" in the 2016 album "Hsu-nami".
- Sylvia Jiaju Shen – Pipa on the track "The Great Race" and "The Heart of the Azure Dragon" in the 2016 album "Hsu-nami".
- Hwa-Chow Oliver Hsu (許華洲) – Cello on the track "Reincarnation", "Black Tortoise" and "Dragon King of the North Sea" in the 2016 album "Hsu-nami".
- Kaoru Watanabe – Shakuhachi on the track "White Tigers Tail" and "Ride the Open Seas" in the 2016 album "Hsu-nami".
- Sumie Kaneko – Shamisen and Vocal on the track "Celestial Wolf" in the 2016 album "Hsu-nami".
- Andy Lin (林維洋) – Viola on the track "Reincarnation" in the 2016 album "Hsu-nami".

== Discography ==
=== Singles and compilations ===
- In 2006, the band released the single "Rogue Wave," on the Po Records ComPOlation Volume III, a Ramapo College-based record label.
- In 2007, the band released the single "Mimosa," on the Po Records ComPOlation Volume IV.
- In 2008, the band released the single "Entering The Mandala" on the Po Records ComPOlation Volume V.

=== Albums ===
- Entering the Mandala – 30 November 2007.
- The Four Noble Truths – 24 March 2009. (International Release) 2 December 2011 (Taiwan Release)
- Hsu-Nami – 30 June 2016.
