= Shadowbinders =

Webcomic

- Author(s): Kambrea "Geeky Sparkes" Pratt & Thomas "Kneon" Pratt
- Website: shopclownfish.com/collections/all
- Current status/schedule: Ongoing
- Launch date: August 27, 2010
- End date: April 10, 2018 (Original Run)
- Genre(s): Steampunk, Fantasy

Shadowbinders is a young adult fantasy webcomic that features a number of steampunk themed elements. The comic is written and drawn by husband and wife Kambrea "Geeky Sparkles" Pratt (writer) and Thomas "Kneon" Pratt (artist), who has worked on Disney comics for Gemstone Publishing. According to a television interview on WTAJ-TV, the current storyline came about when the Pratts mixed two different story ideas together. Since its publication, Shadowbinders has been covered and reviewed by comics media outlets such as Comic Book Resources and Sequential Tart.

== Overview ==
The comic launched on August 27, 2010 and was initially updated at the rate of 2-3 pages per week. A graphic novel containing the first four chapters was released in October, 2011, and a second in August, 2012 containing Chapters 5 and 6. Digital versions of both graphic novels were made available on the ComicsPlus app by iVerse Media on October 31, 2012. An omnibus collection of the first six chapters of the comic was also published in October 2012.

Originally published on www.shadowbinders.com, the comic was part of Keenspot from 2012-2013 until returning to its original URL. The last posting to the website was on April 10, 2018.

In March 2021, the Pratts announced on their YouTube channel that funding for a reprint of the first two omnibus volumes of the book would be obtained via the crowdfunding site Indiegogo.

In 2023 a pre-order campaign Vol. 3 was launched on their site for July 2024 release.

== Characters ==
Mia White (protagonist) is a 17-year teen aged Earth girl who is transported to the world of Belatyr via a magic ring left to her by her deceased grandfather.

Crimson Rhen is a brash, arrogant, narcissistic mage and captain of a famous airship called The True North.

Tristan Barret is both the "brains and brawn" of The True North. He's Rhen's first mate.

Elaina is an apparently wealthy young woman with a mysterious past who is staying onboard The True North.

Andrew Mason is a young orphan boy that Crimson Rhen has taken under his wing.

Winston is a strange rabbit / lemur hybrid called a "feeb."

== Kickstarter project ==
In November 2013, the Pratts attempted to use Kickstarter to fund a prequel to Shadowbinders called Crimson Rhen of The True North. The campaign is most notable for popularizing the term "Kicktrolling", as a backer pledged $10,000 to their campaign and then subsequently backed out. The trolling incident garnered media attention on several comic book blogs as well as being front-paged on popular tech sites such as Hacker News and Golem.de. Despite being featured as a Kickstarter Project of the Day, and being mentioned on high-traffic sites such as io9 and USA Today, the Pratts ultimately decided to cancel funding so as to avoid another potential trolling incident. In 2022 the project was resumed and crowdfunded on Indiegogo.

== Collected Publications ==
- Shadowbinders, Vol. 1, Clownfish Media, 2011, ISBN 978-0-615-55750-2.
- Shadowbinders, Vol. 2, Clownfish Media, 2012, ISBN 978-0-615-68804-6.
- Shadowbinders Book One (Omnibus), Clownfish Studios, LLC, 2012, ISBN 978-1-622-09386-1
