= List of anime and manga conventions =

This is a list of noteworthy (Note: Note: A convention is presumed noteworthy if it has received significant coverage in reliable sources that are independent of the convention and satisfies the inclusion criteria for a stand-alone article. Other conditions may apply.) anime conventions from around the world, as distinct from brony conventions, comic book conventions, furry conventions, gaming conventions, horror conventions, multigenre conventions, and science fiction conventions. This list is sectioned by location, and included with the list is the year the convention was established, as well as the months or dates which the convention are typically held within. Multi-genre, comic book, furry, gaming, and science fiction conventions are not listed here.

== North America ==
| Convention | City | State/Province | Country | Month held | Established |
|---|---|---|---|---|---|
| Ai-Kon | Winnipeg | Manitoba | Canada | February & July | 2001 |
| Animaritime | Fredericton | New Brunswick | Canada | July | 2004 |
| Animate! Raleigh | Raleigh | North Carolina | United States | January | 2024 |
| Animazement | Raleigh | North Carolina | United States | May | 1998 |
| Anime Boston | Boston | Massachusetts | United States | March/April | 2003 |
| Anime Central | Rosemont | Illinois | United States | May | 1998 |
| Anime Detour | Minneapolis | Minnesota | United States | April | 2004 |
| Anime Evolution | Vancouver | British Columbia | Canada | July | 1998 |
| Anime Expo | Los Angeles | California | United States | July | 1992 |
| Anime Festival Orlando | Orlando | Florida | United States | June | 2000 |
| Anime Festival Wichita | Wichita | Kansas | United States | July | 2005 |
| Anime Frontier | Fort Worth | Texas | United States | December | 2021 |
| Anime Impulse | Pomona | California | United States | February | 2016 |
| Anime Los Angeles | Long Beach | California | United States | January | 2005 |
| Anime Matsuri | Houston | Texas | United States | July | 2007 |
| Anime Midwest | Rosemont | Illinois | United States | July | 2011 |
| Anime Milwaukee | Milwaukee | Wisconsin | United States | February | 2007 |
| Anime NebrasKon | Council Bluffs | Iowa | United States | October | 2004 |
| Anime North | Toronto | Ontario | Canada | May | 1997 |
| Anime NYC | New York City | New York | United States | August | 2017 |
| Anime Pasadena | Pasadena | California | United States | November | 2018 |
| Anime Revolution | Vancouver | British Columbia | Canada | August | 2012 |
| Anime USA | Chantilly | Virginia | United States | October/November | 1999 |
| Anime Weekend Atlanta | Atlanta | Georgia | United States | December | 1995 |
| AnimeIowa | Des Moines | Iowa | United States | July | 1997 |
| Animethon | Edmonton | Alberta | Canada | August | 1994 |
| Arkansas Anime Festival | Springdale | Arkansas | United States | June | 2007 |
| A-Kon | Irving | Texas | United States | June | 1990 |
| Bak-Anime | Bakersfield | California | United States | May | 2010 |
| Castle Point Anime Convention | Secaucus | New Jersey | United States | April/May | 2008 |
| ColossalCon | Sandusky | Ohio | United States | June | 2002 |
| Con-Nichiwa | Tucson | Arizona | United States | March | 2010 |
| FanimeCon | San Jose | California | United States | May | 1994 |
| G-Anime | Gatineau | Quebec | Canada | January | 2009 |
| Ikkicon | Round Rock | Texas | United States | January | 2007 |
| JAFAX | Grand Rapids | Michigan | United States | June | 1996 |
| Kami-Con | Birmingham | Alabama | United States | February | 2009 |
| Katsucon | National Harbor | Maryland | United States | February | 1995 |
| Kawaii Kon | Honolulu | Hawaii | United States | March/April | 2005 |
| KimoKawaii | Conroe | Texas | United States | June | 2002 |
| Kitsune Kon | Green Bay | Wisconsin | United States | July | 2011 |
| Kumoricon | Portland | Oregon | United States | October | 2003 |
| Matsuricon | Columbus | Ohio | United States | August | 2006 |
| Metrocon | Tampa | Florida | United States | June | 2003 |
| Middle Tennessee Anime Convention | Nashville | Tennessee | United States | April | 1999 |
| Nadeshicon | Quebec City | Quebec | Canada | April | 2011 |
| Naka-Kon | Overland Park | Kansas | United States | May | 2005 |
| Nan Desu Kan | Aurora | Colorado | United States | September | 1997 |
| Nekocon | Hampton | Virginia | United States | November | 1998 |
| No Brand Con | Eau Claire | Wisconsin | United States | May | 2002 |
| Ohayocon | Dayton | Ohio | United States | January/February | 2001 |
| OMGcon | Owensboro | Kentucky | United States | June | 2006 |
| Oni-Con | Houston | Texas | United States | October/November | 2004 |
| Otafest | Calgary | Alberta | Canada | May | 1999 |
| Otakon | Washington | D.C. | United States | July/August | 1994 |
| Otakuthon | Montreal | Quebec | Canada | August | 2006 |
| PortConMaine | South Portland | Maine | United States | June | 2002 |
| QC Anime-zing! | Davenport | Iowa | United States | July | 2010 |
| Saboten Con | Phoenix | Arizona | United States | September | 2008 |
| SacAnime | Sacramento | California | United States | January, April, September | 2004 |
| Sakura-Con | Seattle | Washington | United States | April | 1998 |
| San Japan | San Antonio | Texas | United States | August/September | 2008 |
| SeizaCon | Owensboro | Kentucky | United States | March | 2009 |
| Setsucon | Altoona | Pennsylvania | United States | January/February | 2007 |
| Tekko | Pittsburgh | Pennsylvania | United States | July | 2003 |
| Tokyo, OK | Tulsa | Oklahoma | United States | July | 2008 |
| Tora-Con | Rochester | New York | United States | April | 2005 |
| Tsubasacon | Charleston | West Virginia | United States | October | 2004 |
| Yama-Con | Pigeon Forge | Tennessee | United States | December | 2012 |
| Youmacon | Detroit | Michigan | United States | October/November | 2005 |

== South America ==
| Convention | City | Country | Month held | Established |
|---|---|---|---|---|
| Anime Friends | São Paulo | Brazil | July | 2003 |
| Anime Summit | Brasília | Brazil | May | 2022 |

== Asia-Pacific ==
| Convention | City | Country | Month held | Established |
|---|---|---|---|---|
| AniManGaki | Seri Kembangan | Malaysia | varies | 2009 |
| Anime Festival Asia | Bangkok | Thailand | varies | 2015 |
| Anime Festival Asia | Jakarta | Indonesia | September | 2012 |
| Anime Festival Asia | Kuala Lumpur | Malaysia | varies | 2012 |
| Anime Festival Asia | Singapore | Singapore | November | 2008 |
| Anime X Game Festival | Goyang | South Korea | December | 2018 |
| AnimeJapan | Tokyo | Japan | March | 2014 |
| AVCon | Adelaide | Australia | July | 2002 |
| Comic Fiesta | Kuala Lumpur | Malaysia | December | 2002 |
| Comic World | Seoul | South Korea | varies | 1999 |
| Comifuro | BSD City | Indonesia | varies | 2012 |
| Comiket | Tokyo | Japan | August and December | 1975 |
| Cosplay Mania | Pasay | Philippines | September/October | 2008 |
| Jump Festa | Chiba | Japan | December | 1999 |
| Kadokawa Light Novel Expo | Saitama | Japan | varies | 2020 |
| NAJ Cosfest | Kohima | India | July | 2013 |
| Ozine Fest | Mandaluyong | Philippines | April | 2005 |
| Overload | Auckland | New Zealand | April/September | 2006 |
| SMASH! | Sydney | Australia | July | 2007 |

== Europe ==
| Convention | City | Country | Month held | Established |
|---|---|---|---|---|
| AnimagiC | Mannheim | Germany | August | 1999 |
| Animecon | Kuopio | Finland | July | 1999 |
| Animefest | Brno | Czech Republic | May | 2004 |
| Connichi | Kassel | Germany | September | 2002 |
| Desucon | Lahti | Finland | June | 2009 |
| Hyper Japan | London | United Kingdom | July | 2010 |
| Japan Expo | Paris | France | July | 1999 |
| J-Popcon | Copenhagen | Denmark | April | 2000 |
| Manga Barcelona | Barcelona | Spain | October | 1995 |
| NärCon | Linköping | Sweden | July | 2002 |

== Defunct and on-hiatus conventions ==
These are notable conventions that have at one time existed, but have either gone on hiatus for more than one year, were merged into other conventions, or have finished operating entirely. The category conventions fall under are determined by the amount of communication given by convention officials. Anime conventions disrupted by the COVID-19 pandemic are not listed here unless they became defunct.

- On Hiatus - Any convention that has had an official announcement of hiatus of 3 years or less.
- Inactive - Any convention that has been on Hiatus for more than 3 years, but has a working website.
- Defunct - An official or reliable announcement is made saying that the convention has ceased operations. If there is no communication then another criterion can be considered, such as an official website appearing to be dead (HTTP 404 errors) or the website has been changed to another individual with no relation.
- Merged - An official announcement of a merger between two conventions has been made.

| Convention | City | Country | First held | Last Held | Status |
|---|---|---|---|---|---|
| AM² | Anaheim | United States | 2011 | 2012 | Defunct |
| Ani-Jam | Fresno | United States | 2003 | 2014 | Defunct |
| AnimeCon | San Jose | United States | 1991 | 1991 | Defunct |
| AnimeFest | Dallas | United States | 1992 | 2024 | Inactive |
| AnimeNEXT | Edison | United States | 2002 | 2023 | On Hiatus |
| Aniwave | Wilmington | United States | 2007 | 2015 | Defunct |
| Anime Banzai | Layton | United States | 2005 | 2024 | Defunct |
| Anime Conji | San Diego | United States | 2010 | 2019 | Defunct |
| Anime Contents Expo | Chiba | Japan | 2012 | 2013 | Merged |
| Anime Mid-Atlantic | Chesapeake | United States | 2001 | 2018 | Defunct |
| Anime Punch! | Columbus | United States | 2005 | 2017 | Defunct |
| Anime Salt Lake | Taylorsville | United States | 2012 | 2014 | Defunct |
| Anime South | Pensacola Beach | United States | 2005 | 2013 | Defunct |
| Animania | Multi-city | Australia | 2002 | 2014 | Defunct |
| AniZona | Mesa | United States | 2005 | 2009 | Defunct |
| AUKcon | London | United Kingdom | 1994 | 1994 | Defunct |
| Aurora-Con | Anchorage | United States | 2006 | 2008 | Defunct |
| AzeCON | Baku | Azerbaijan | 2014 | 2019 | Defunct |
| Big Apple Anime Fest | New York City | United States | 2001 | 2003 | Defunct |
| Crunchyroll Expo | San Jose | United States | 2017 | 2022 | On Hiatus |
| D-Con | Dundee | United Kingdom | 2009 | 2011 | Defunct |
| ExpoManga | Madrid | Spain | 2001 | 2018 | Defunct |
| Glass City Con | Toledo | United States | 2009 | 2017 | Merged |
| Hamacon | Huntsville | United States | 2010 | 2019 | Defunct |
| Ikasucon | Fort Wayne | United States | 2003 | 2017 | Inactive |
| Izumicon | Oklahoma City | United States | 2007 | 2017 | Defunct |
| Japan Expo USA | San Mateo | United States | 2013 | 2014 | Inactive |
| KotoriCon | Sewell | United States | 2010 | 2020 | Defunct |
| Kunicon | Multi-city | United States | 2004 | 2005 | Defunct |
| Madman Anime Festival | Multi-city | Australia | 2016 | 2020 | Defunct |
| MangaNEXT | East Rutherford | United States | 2006 | 2012 | Defunct |
| Manifest | Melbourne | Australia | 2001 | 2013 | Defunct |
| MechaCon | New Orleans | United States | 2005 | 2021 | Defunct |
| NashiCon | Columbia | United States | 2008 | 2020 | Inactive |
| New York Anime Festival | New York City | United States | 2007 | 2011 | Merged |
| Otakon Vegas | Las Vegas | United States | 2014 | 2018 | Inactive |
| PersaCon | Huntsville | United States | 2003 | 2011 | Defunct |
| Providence Anime Conference | Providence | United States | 2008 | 2008 | Defunct |
| SaikouCon | White Haven | United States | 2013 | 2019 | Defunct |
| Senshi-Con | Anchorage | United States | 2005 | 2023 | Defunct |
| Shinboku-con | Huron | United States | 2007 | 2014 | Defunct |
| Shoujocon | Multi-city | United States | 2000 | 2003 | Defunct |
| Shuto Con | Lansing | United States | 2011 | 2019 | Defunct |
| SNAFU Con | Reno | United States | 2010 | 2026 | Defunct |
| SoDak Con | Rapid City | United States | 2009 | 2018 | Defunct |
| Sogen Con | Sioux Falls | United States | 2005 | 2013 | Defunct |
| SugoiCon | Sharonville | United States | 2000 | 2013 | Defunct |
| Tokyo International Anime Fair | Tokyo | Japan | 2002 | 2013 | Merged |
| Tomo-Dachi | Derry | United Kingdom | 2005 | 2007 | Defunct |
| UppCon | Multi-city | Sweden | 2001 | 2012 | Defunct |
| Wai-Con | Perth | Australia | 2004 | 2014 | Defunct |
| Yaoi-Con | Santa Clara | United States | 2001 | 2017 | Defunct |
| Yuricon | Newark | United States | 2003 | 2007 | Defunct |

== See also ==
- List of comic book conventions
- List of gaming conventions
- List of multigenre conventions
- List of My Little Pony conventions
- List of science fiction conventions
- List of Worldcons
- List of Worldcons by city
