= Kunicon =

Anime convention series in the United States

- Status: Defunct
- Locations: Miami Beach, Florida (2004); Saint Louis, Missouri (2005); Atlanta, Georgia (2005); Denver, Colorado (2005)
- Country: United States
- Inaugurated: 2004
- Most recent: 2005

Kunicon was a series of anime conventions organized by Subarashii Nation (formerly D20, Inc.) and held throughout the United States from December 2004 through June 2005. Originally named "Otakucon", the convention was renamed to "Kunicon" after controversy erupted over the name being similar to Otakon, an anime convention held in Baltimore, Maryland. While Kunicon's original goal was to hold a convention in twelve major cities across the United States, these plans were cut short after 4 conventions as Kunicon continued to be plagued with controversy and cost overruns.

== Programming ==
Kunicon held several events over the course of a convention, including gaming competitions, cosplay contests, panels, live music concerts, anime screenings, and special performances.

== History ==
Originally announced as "Otakucon", the convention started going by "OtakuCon Miami Beach" several months before the first convention in Miami, Florida. Otakon staff has reported that they had ordered a cease-and-desist, but the convention chairman, Manny Camacho, had been reported as saying that the name was simply changed to avoid confusion. When the St. Louis event was announced as the second convention, it was announced under the name "Kunicon".

Following the first convention in Miami, the staff cited an attendance of 5,000 people, which precisely matched their pre-con estimate. However, pictures taken by a fan photographer was used as evidence that numbers claimed by Kunicon were inflated.

Kunicon continued to plan events for San Diego, St. Louis, Atlanta, and Denver. However, San Diego was quickly canceled and the next convention was held in St. Louis in March 2005. The fourth and final Kunicon was held in Denver in June 2005, but went $30,000 over budget.

The controversy came to an end when Emanuel "Manny" Camacho, the Kunicon chairman, announced on his LiveJournal that he was unable to contact Subarashii Nation and he could not see how the next convention, Kunicon Miami in December 2005, could take place. He also stated that the staff and employees of the convention have not been paid for their work.

=== Event history ===
Dates	Location	Atten.	Guests
December 17–19, 2004	Fontainebleau Hilton Resort; Miami, Florida	3,400	Steve Bennett, Mandy Bonhomme, Johnny Yong Bosch, David Kaye, Scott McNeil, Vic Mignogna, Kirby Morrow, Tomonori Ochikoshi, Carrie Savage, Joshua Seth, Doug Smith, and Toshifumi Yoshida.
March 4–6, 2005	Millennium Hotel; St. Louis, Missouri		David Carradine, Tom Bateman, Steve Bennett, Robert DeJesus, Richard Epcar, Michael "Piano Squall" Gluck, Kevin McKeever, Scott McNeil, Vic Mignogna, Chris Patton, Doug Smith, Steve Yun, and Tommy Yune.
May 27–29, 2005	Westin Peachtree Plaza; Atlanta, Georgia		10Sheen, Greg Ayres, Emily DeJesus, Robert DeJesus, Richard Epcar, Michael "Piano Squall" Gluck, Tiffany Grant, Matt Greenfield, Mike McFarland, Kevin McKeever, Chris Patton, phoenix/NEBULIN, Sean Schemmel, Select Start, Mike Sinterniklaas, Doug Smith, Team Ryouko, Yellow Dancer, Toshifumi Yoshida, and Tommy Yune.
June 17–19, 2005	Marriott Tech Center; Denver, Colorado	475	10Sheen, Laura Bailey, Tom Bateman, Steve Bennett, Lindsay Cibos, Colleen Clinkenbeard, Richard Epcar, Michael "Piano Squall" Gluck, Tiffany Grant, Matt Greenfield, Jared Hodges, Samantha Inoue-Harte, Mike McFarland, phoenix/NEBULIN, Sean Schemmel, Jan Scott-Frazier, Mike Sinterniklaas, Yellow Dancer, and Steve Yun.
