= Animania =

Annual anime convention

Animania Festival
- Jono and Guu, the Animania mascots, with the Animania logo (2006 event)
- Status: Defunct
- Venue: Australian Technology Park (main convention)
- Locations: Sydney, Brisbane, Melbourne and Adelaide
- Country: Australia
- Inaugurated: 2002
- Most recent: 2014
- Major events: Game shows, concerts, cosplay, competitions, dealers room, panels, workshops, karaoke, video game room, artist's alley, community groups, video rooms and food fair
- Website: http://www.animania.net.au

Animania was an annual anime convention that was held in Sydney, Australia. Originally run by local University anime societies, Animania and later organised by Aurora Entertainment, including several events in Sydney, Brisbane, Melbourne, and Adelaide. The term Animania in the 1990s referred to online-organized meetings of Animaniacs fans from around the world.

== Programming ==
Animania featured many of the typical events found at anime conventions including cosplay and AMV (anime music video) competitions, anime screenings, workshops, karaoke, video games such as Dance Dance Revolution. In addition to such staples, Animania experimented with several of its own attractions, such as live fandubbing, an "Iron Artist" drawing competition based on the Iron Chef TV show, the anime cover-band Halcyon, and "Animania Fusion", a skit-based video comedy featuring members of Animania staff.

=== Halcyon ===
Halcyon made their debut at Animania 2003 and at that time consisted of three members: Amanda Setiadi as the vocalist, Michael Lee (aka "Muki") as the acoustic guitar player, and Rosi Yu as the violinist. The band performed a small set and were sufficiently popular to warrant their return for Animania in 2005, as well as making appearances at other anime-related events in Sydney. The band has also grown from the original three-member setup to six, including a drummer, Michael Ip, and two more guitarists, Lindsay Nighjoy on bass and Jason Solomon on lead.

At the main Sydney Animania in 2007, Halcyon played two sets, including an acoustic set (without drums) at the Friday preview night, and with the full band on the Saturday night.

Halcyon's "style" is playing songs that have appeared in anime and Japanese video games, creating original translations (and occasionally reinterpretations) of the Japanese lyrics. Songs they have covered include Fly Me to the Moon from Neon Genesis Evangelion and HT from Trigun.

=== World Cosplay Summit ===
At the September 2007 Sydney event Animania announced they had been accepted by the World Cosplay Summit to host the Australian competitions to compete in Japan at WCS 2009. This was the first time Australia has been represented at WCS.

Preliminary competition events were held at the 2008 events with the finals taking place at August 2008 Sydney event. The winning team was flown to Japan in 2009 to compete in the World Cosplay Summit. The team representing Australia for the first time is the Love and Peace Movement, consisting of Tsubaki Chan and Cattypatra.

The 2008 Sydney August event featured two live concerts: Argent La Rosa, a J-Rock styled band, and Yunyu.

In 2009 Animania partnered with the Adelaide OzAsia Festival, expanding the event to 4 cities.

=== Event history ===
| Dates | Location | Guests |
|---|---|---|
| 12 October 2002 | Eastern Avenue Lecture Theatre and Auditorium Complex; Sydney, Australia | |
| 11–12 October 2003 | The Scientia, University of New South Wales; Kensington, Australia | Lewis Morley. |
| 23–24 October 2004 | Sydney City Town Hall; Sydney, Australia | |
| 3 September 2005 | Holiday Inn Brisbane; Brisbane, Australia | |
| 8–9 October 2005 | Sydney City Town Hall; Sydney, Australia | |
| 20 May 2006 | Holiday Inn Brisbane; Brisbane, Australia | |
| 1 July 2006 | The Victoria Hotel; Melbourne, Australia | |
| 12 August 2006 | Carlton Crest Hotel; Sydney, Australia | |
| 9 September 2006 | Holiday Inn Brisbane; Brisbane, Australia | |
| 30 September – 1 October 2006 | Sydney Town Hall; Sydney, Australia | |
| 31 March 2007 | Carlton Crest Hotel; Sydney, Australia | |
| 28 April 2007 | Rydges Hotel, Melbourne; Melbourne, Australia | |
| 26–27 May 2007 | Holiday Inn Brisbane; Brisbane, Australia | |
| 28–30 September 2007 | Sydney Town Hall; Sydney, Australia | |
| 29 March 2008 | Citigate Central Hotel (formerly known as Carlton Crest); Sydney, Australia | |
| 19 April 2008 | Rydges Hotel, Melbourne; Melbourne, Australia | |
| 10 May 2008 | Holiday Inn Brisbane; Brisbane, Australia | |
| 23–24 August 2008 | Australian Technology Park; Sydney, Australia | |
| 20 September 2008 | Holiday Inn Brisbane; Brisbane, Australia | |
| 28 March 2009 | Citigate Central Hotel; Sydney, Australia | |
| 18 April 2009 | Rydges Hotel, Melbourne; Melbourne, Australia | |
| 9 May 2009 | Holiday Inn Brisbane; Brisbane, Australia | |
| 5–6 September 2009 | Australian Technology Park; Sydney, Australia | |
| 19 September 2009 | Holiday Inn Brisbane; Brisbane, Australia | |
| 10 October 2009 | Adelaide Festival Centre; Adelaide, Australia | |
| 20 March 2010 | Australian Technology Park; Sydney, Australia | |
| 10 April 2010 | Rydges Hotel, Melbourne; Melbourne, Australia | |
| 1 May 2010 | Mercure Hotel, Brisbane; Brisbane, Australia | |
| 11–12 September 2010 | Australian Technology Park; Sydney, Australia | Rica Matsumoto |
| 2 October 2010 | Adelaide Festival Centre; Adelaide, Australia | |
| 30 October 2010 | Mercure Hotel, Brisbane; Brisbane, Australia | |
| 5 March 2011 | Rydges Melbourne; Melbourne, Australia | |
| 19 March 2011 | Australian Technology Park; Sydney, Australia | |
| 30 April 2011 | Mercure Brisbane; Brisbane, Australia | |
| 17–18 September 2011 | Australian Technology Park; Sydney, Australia | Ikue Ōtani |
| 8 October 2011 | Holiday Inn Brisbane; Brisbane, Australia | |
| 10 March 2012 | Holiday Inn Brisbane; Brisbane, Australia | |
| 24 March 2012 | Australian Technology Park; Sydney, Australia | |
| 22–23 September 2012 | Australian Technology Park; Sydney, Australia | |
| 6 October 2012 | Mercure Brisbane; Brisbane, Australia | |
| 23 March 2013 | Australian Technology Park; Sydney, Australia | |
| 14–15 September 2013 | Australian Technology Park; Sydney, Australia | |
| 22 March 2014 | Australian Technology Park; Sydney, Australia | |

== See also ==
- List of anime conventions
