= JAFAX =

Anime convention

Coordinates: 42°58′7″N 85°40′23″W

- Status: Active
- Genre: Anime, Manga, Gaming
- Venue: Amway Grand Plaza Hotel & DeVos Place
- Location: Grand Rapids, Michigan
- Country: United States
- Inaugurated: 1996
- Attendance: 3,500 in 2016
- Organizer: JAFAX
- Website: http://www.jafax.org/

JAFAX is an annual three day anime convention held during June/July at the Amway Grand Plaza Hotel & DeVos Place in Grand Rapids, Michigan. The convention's full name stands for Japanese Animation Film and Art Expo. JAFAX was previously a two-day event held at Grand Valley State University in Allendale, Michigan and was organized by the university's anime club (Otaku No Anime) and tabletop gaming club (AltReal).

== Programming ==
The convention typically offers anime screenings, an artist alley, dance, fashion shows, game shows, guest speakers, maid cafe, masquerade, music video contest, panel discussions, tabletop gaming, vendors, and video games.

Charity events in 2016 included the 100 Tables Project and a Blood Drive.

== History ==
The event was started in 1995 by Rob Grimes, to spread anime in West Michigan. JAFAX for its first two years was held at the Kendall College of Art and Design, before moving to Grand Valley State University. No convention was held in 2015 due to outgrowing the space available at Grand Valley State University, the search for a new venue, and organizational changes. The event was free until moving in 2016 to the Amway Grand Plaza Hotel & DeVos Place. Registration that year experienced issues and the convention shared its hotel with several weddings. JAFAX 2020 and 2021 were cancelled due to the COVID-19 pandemic.

=== Event history ===
Dates	Location	Atten.	Guests
June 22-23, 1996	Kendall College of Art and Design; Grand Rapids, Michigan	150	
June 21–22, 1997	Kendall College of Art and Design; Grand Rapids, Michigan	350	
June 27–28, 1998	Grand Valley State University; Allendale, Michigan	500	Robert DeJesus
June 19, 1999	Grand Valley State University; Allendale, Michigan	750	
June 24–25, 2000	Grand Valley State University; Allendale, Michigan	800	Robert DeJesus
June 24–25, 2001	Grand Valley State University; Allendale, Michigan	900	Steve Bennett, Robert DeJesus, and Doug Smith.
June 22–23, 2002	Grand Valley State University; Allendale, Michigan	1,300	Steve Bennett, James Dawsey, Robert DeJesus, Nickey Froberg, Amy Howard-Wilson, and Doug Smith.
June 21–22, 2003	Grand Valley State University; Allendale, Michigan	1,500	James Dawsey, Robert DeJesus, Amy Howard-Wilson, Bruce Lewis, Jan Scott-Frazier, and Doug Smith.
June 26–27, 2004	Grand Valley State University; Allendale, Michigan	2,200	Michael Coleman, James Dawsey, Emily DeJesus, Robert DeJesus, Newton Ewell, Nickey Froberg, Amy Howard-Wilson, Bruce Lewis, Kevin Lillard, Jan Scott-Frazier, and Doug Smith.
June 25–26, 2005	Grand Valley State University; Allendale, Michigan		Michael Coleman, James Dawsey, Emily DeJesus, Robert DeJesus, Trevor Devall, Nickey Froberg, Amy Howard-Wilson, Bruce Lewis, and Jan Scott-Frazier.
June 24–25, 2006	Grand Valley State University; Allendale, Michigan		
June 24–25, 2007	Grand Valley State University; Allendale, Michigan	2,500	
June 21–22, 2008	Grand Valley State University; Allendale, Michigan		James Dawsey, Emily DeJesus, Robert DeJesus, Amy Howard-Wilson, Bruce Lewis, Mundee Lewis, Joseph Onyskow, Jan Scott-Frazier, Bruce Lewis, and David G. Wilson III.
June 27–28, 2009	Grand Valley State University; Allendale, Michigan		Mark Crilley, James Dawsey, Emily DeJesus, Robert DeJesus, Amy Howard-Wilson, Bruce Lewis, Mundee Lewis, Joseph Onyskow, Jeremy Robinson, Jan Scott-Frazier, Doug Smith, and David G. Wilson III.
June 26–27, 2010	Grand Valley State University; Allendale, Michigan	3,000	Tiffany Grant, Amy Howard-Wilson, Joseph Onyskow, Jan Scott-Frazier, and Doug Smith.
June 25–26, 2011	Grand Valley State University; Allendale, Michigan	3,200	James Dawsey, Emily DeJesus, Robert DeJesus, Kyle Hebert, Michael House, Dan Houser, Joseph Onyskow, Kristene Onyskow, Jan Scott-Frazier, and Doug Smith.
June 23–24, 2012	Grand Valley State University; Allendale, Michigan	3,500	Mark Crilley, James Dawsey, Emily DeJesus, Robert DeJesus, Dan Houser, Amy Howard-Wilson, Joseph Onyskow, Kristene Onyskow, Jeremy Robinson, Salia, Jan Scott-Frazier, Doug Smith, and David G. Wilson III.
June 22–23, 2013	Grand Valley State University; Allendale, Michigan	3,800	Yunmao Ayakawa, James Dawsey, Emily DeJesus, Robert DeJesus, Dan Houser, Amy Howard-Wilson, Comfort Love, Joseph Onyskow, Kristene Onyskow, Jan Scott-Frazier, Doug Smith, David G. Wilson III, and Adam Withers.
June 21–22, 2014	Grand Valley State University; Allendale, Michigan	5,500	James Dawsey, Emily DeJesus, Robert DeJesus, Darrel Guilbeau, Dan Houser, Amy Howard-Wilson, Joseph Onyskow, Kristene Onyskow, Chris Rager, Jan Scott-Frazier, Doug Smith, Lisle Wilkerson, and David G. Wilson III.
June 24–26, 2016	Amway Grand Plaza Hotel & DeVos Place; Grand Rapids, Michigan	3,500	2D6, James Dawsey, Dan Houser, Amy Howard-Wilson, Samantha Inoue-Harte, Brittney Karbowski, Comfort Love, Jake Paque, Tyson Rinehart, David G. Wilson III, and Adam Withers.
June 16–18, 2017	Amway Grand Plaza Hotel & DeVos Place; Grand Rapids, Michigan		Emily DeJesus, Robert DeJesus, Kristie Good, Kyle Hebert, Dan Houser, Andrew Love, Comfort Love, J. Michael Tatum, David Vincent, and Lex Winter.
June 29 - July 1, 2018	Amway Grand Plaza Hotel & DeVos Place; Grand Rapids, Michigan		Zach Aguilar, Justin Briner, Clifford Chapin, Colleen Clinkenbeard, Todd Haberkorn, Comfort Love, Lex Winter, and Adam Withers.
June 7-9, 2019	Amway Grand Plaza Hotel & DeVos Place; Grand Rapids, Michigan		Steve Blum, Luci Christian, Cherami Leigh, Comfort Love, Jamie Marchi, Lex Winter, and Adam Withers.
June 24-26, 2022	Amway Grand Plaza Hotel & DeVos Place; Grand Rapids, Michigan		Tia Ballard, Jillian Coglan, Samurai Dan Coglan, Caitlin Glass, Jerry Jewell, Tyson Rinehart, and Lex Winter.
June 9-11, 2023	Amway Grand Plaza Hotel & DeVos Place; Grand Rapids, Michigan		Aaron Campbell, Sean Chiplock, Kohei Hattori, Cherami Leigh, Katriel Paige, and Lex Winter.
June 21-23, 2024	Amway Grand Plaza Hotel & DeVos Place; Grand Rapids, Michigan		Jillian Coglan, Samurai Dan Coglan, Kohei Hattori, Xanthe Huynh, Mike McFarland, and Chris Patton.
June 27-29, 2025	Amway Grand Plaza Hotel & DeVos Place; Grand Rapids, Michigan		Tiana Camacho, David Errigo Jr., Kohei Hattori, and Stephanie Nadolny.
June 5-7, 2026	DeVos Place; Grand Rapids, Michigan		Jason Douglas, Jeremy Inman, Casey Mongillo, and Alex Organ.
