= NärCon =

Combined gaming and anime convention

Närcon
- NärCon logo with dragon silhouette from 2022.

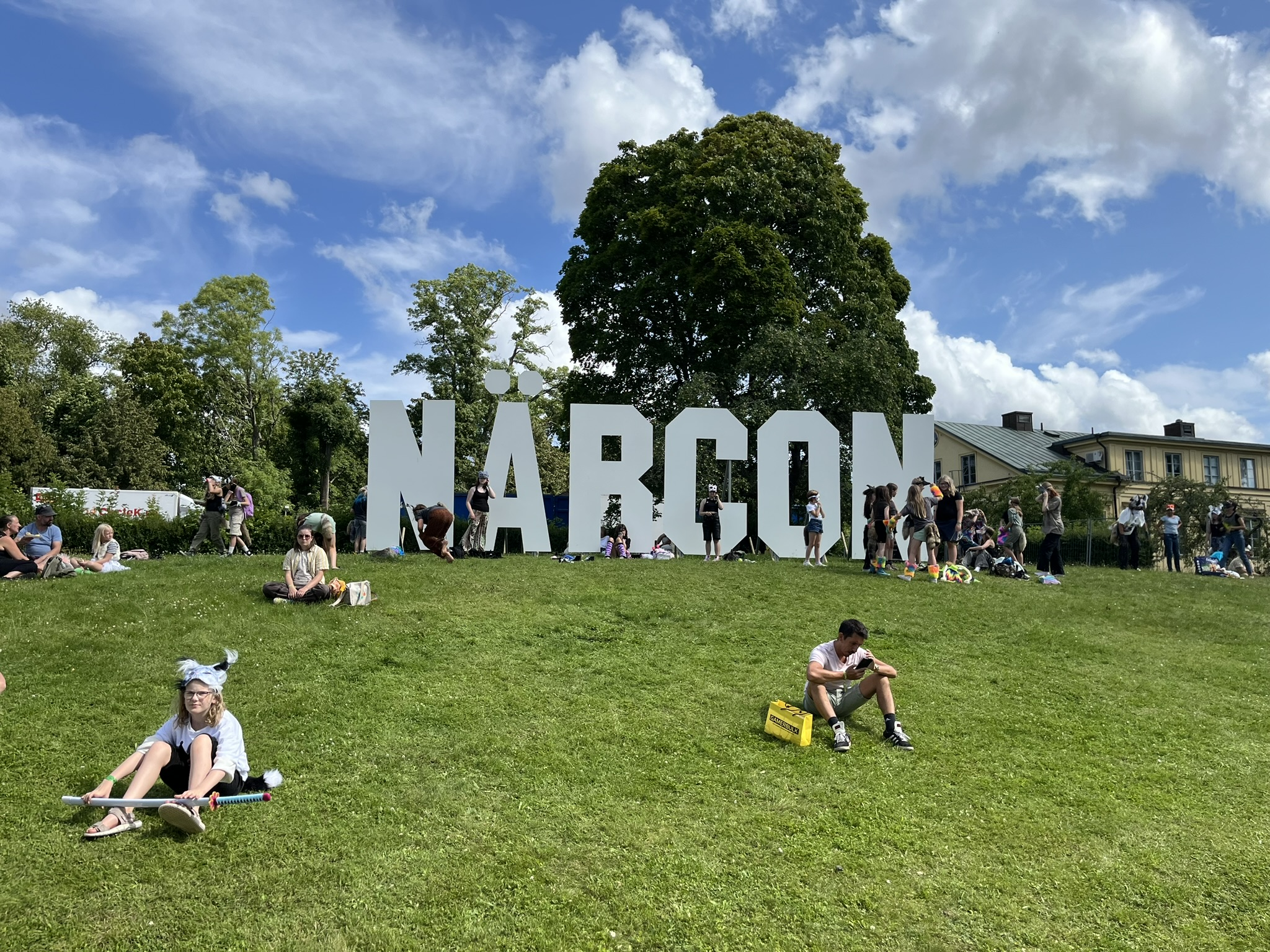
- Närcon sign at the outdoors area around Linköping University campus, 2025.
- Status: Active
- Genre: Gaming, anime and cosplay convention
- Frequency: Bi-annually
- Venue: Winter: Various schools in Linköping, Sweden; Summer: Linköping University
- Inaugurated: 2002
- Founder: Sam Anlér
- Most recent: July 27, 2025
- Attendance: 10,000-17,000 (Summer) 1,000-3,000 (Winter)
- Organiser: NärCon Eventbyrå AB
- Website: en.narcon.se

Närcon (formally written as NärCon) is a combined gaming and anime convention which is arranged twice per year in Linköping, Sweden by NärCon Eventbyrå AB. It is the largest event of its kind in Scandinavia. The main event (NärCon Sommar, summer) usually starts at the end of July and offers activities such as concerts, board games, card games and roleplaying activities. Additionally, there are rooms dedicated for computer and console gaming. Competitive e-sports and cosplay tournaments are also arranged.

== History ==
NärCon was founded in 2002 by Sam Anlér and was hosted at A-huset and Kulturpalatset in Örebro. The event has been hosted yearly since then.

Year	Event
2006	The five year anniversary NärCon event takes place at Karolinska gymnasiet in Örebro.
2007	Närcon receives around 700 visitors.
2008	The event receives around 900 visitors.
2009	The event receives roughly 1 500 visitors, the convention remains open for four days for the first time.
2010	NärCon faces difficulties and plans not to open, but eventually manages to open and receives roughly 1 000 participants.
2011	The event moves to the Linköping University campus for its ten-year anniversary and receives 2 000 participants. The convention is visited by its first international guest, the voice actor Vic Mignogna.
2012	The convention receives 3 400 participants and becomes the largest convention of its kind in Scandinavia. The Nordic Cosplay Championship is held for the first time.
2013	Närcon is arranged in the winter, in addition to the summer event. The winter event is held in February and receives roughly 1 500 visitors, whilst the summer event, held in July, receives around 5 250 participants.
2014	Närcon is hosted in Stockholm for the first time and attracts nearly 1 800 participants. NärCon Winter 2014 commences in February and attracts 1 900, the Japanese cosplayer Reika hosts a lecture. Over 7 000 visits the newly expanded summer festival. The year's honorary guests include the Japanese cosplayer KANAME, the YouTubers Eat Your Kimchi and Loke Nyberg.
2015	NärCon Summer 2015 is arranged at Linköping University and attracts 8 500. The Filipino cosplayer Alodia Gosiengfiao, the photographer Shiro Ang and the comedy group DunderHumor are honorary guests. The Nordic Cosplay Championship is broadcast live on the main state television channel; SVT1, as well as on the Finnish YLE.
2017	Närcon Winter 2017 is arranged in February. Närcon Summer 2017 is arranged in July and receives a record 10 000 participants. Ellen McLain and John Patrick Lowrie are honorary guests.
2018	Närcon Summer 2018 is arranged in Linköping University. Zach Callison are one of the honorary guests.
2019	Närcon Summer 2019 is arranged in Linköping University, setting a new record with 12 500 visitors.
2020	The Japanese band FATE GEAR performs at the February NärCon event, which was hosted at Berzeliusskolan. Närcon Summer 2020 is cancelled due to the global COVID-19 pandemic. The festival was held in a digital format, live streamed on Twitch.tv as Närconline, collecting donations for Musikhjälpen.
2022	NärCon returned after the pandemic for a winter event in February. Necronomidol performs at the Summer event.
2023	A winter and a summer event was organized.
2024	NärCon Winter takes place at Berzeliusskolan and Katedralskolan in Linköping in February which saw approximately 3 000 attendees partake. The Summer event started on July 25th with over 15 000 visitors. 2024 saw NärCon hold its first NärCon Expo event in Södertälje, near Stockholm. The event had approximately 1 500 visitors.
2025	NärCon Winter was held once more in February at Berzeliusskkolan and Katedralskolan and saw approximately 3000 visitors. NärCon Sommar was held at Linköping University in July and saw approximately 20 000 visitors. The first NärCon Expo was held in Södertälje.
2026	NärCon Winter was held once more in February at Berzeliusskolan and Kathedralskolan. NärCon Sommar took place between July 23rd and July 26th, with over 20 000 visitors. The second ever Närcon Expo will be held on the 21st to the 22nd of November.

== Nordic Cosplay Championship ==
One of NärCon's major events include cosplay competitions. NärCon hosts the Nordic Cosplay Championship every year, the championship, which is co-ordinated by event organizers from Denmark, Finland, Iceland, Norway and Sweden pick winners from each respective cosplay scene. 13 cosplayers then meet at NärCon in order to compete for prizes, one of them being a trip to Japan for two. In 2018, the championship had its first observer nations; Lithuania and Latvia.

== See also ==
- List of anime conventions
