= SugoiCon =

Annual anime convention in Sharonville, Ohio

Coordinates: 39°16′46″N 84°26′33″W

- SugoiCon logo.
- Status: Defunct
- Venue: Crowne Plaza Cincinnati North
- Locations: Sharonville, Ohio, United States
- Country: United States
- Inaugurated: 2000
- Most recent: 2013
- Attendance: 1,400 in 2006
- Major events: Video rooms, anime music video contest, masquerade, dance, dealer's room, panels, workshops, video game room, artist's alley, concert and karaoke
- Organizer: Southwest Ohio Regional Animation

SugoiCon was an annual three day anime convention in the Cincinnati–Northern Kentucky metropolitan area held at the Crowne Plaza Cincinnati North in Sharonville, Ohio, United States. The convention was organized by Southwest Ohio Regional Animation.

== Programming ==
The convention typically featured an anime music video contest, concerts, costume contest, dealers room, game shows, guest panels, karaoke, masquerade, rave, video rooms, and workshops. Due to scheduling problems, the 2014 event was cancelled.

== History ==
=== Event history ===
Dates	Location	Atten.	Guests
November 10–12, 2000	Holiday Inn Cincinnati Airport; Erlanger, Kentucky	522	Steve Bennett, Robert DeJesus, Akira Gajou, Matt K. Miller, Neil Nadelman, Jan Scott-Frazier, and Doug Smith.
November 9–11, 2001	Holiday Inn Cincinnati Airport; Erlanger, Kentucky	630	Steve Bennett, Robert DeJesus, Matt K. Miller, Neil Nadelman, Jan Scott-Frazier, and Doug Smith.
October 18–20, 2002	Holiday Inn Cincinnati Airport; Erlanger, Kentucky	930	Steve Bennett, Robert DeJesus, Rebecca Forstadt, Yoshinori Kanemori, Sen'no Knife, Masao Maruyama, Neil Nadelman, Nekoi Rutoto, Jan Scott-Frazier, Doug Smith, and SWEK.
November 21–23, 2003	Cincinnati Marriott at RiverCenter; Covington, Kentucky		Matt Boyd, Becky Cloonan, Greg Dean, Emily DeJesus, Robert DeJesus, Rebecca Forstadt, Dan Hess, Taliesin Jaffe, Bruce Lewis, Ian McConville, Dave Merrill, Neil Nadelman, Jen Lee Quick, Monica Rial, Doug Smith, and Jes Weigand.
November 19–21, 2004	Cincinnati Marriott at RiverCenter; Covington, Kentucky	1,333	Greg Ayres, Emily DeJesus, Robert DeJesus, Dan Hess, Ichiro Itano, Takao Koyama, Bruce Lewis, Dave Merrill, Neil Nadelman, Jan Scott-Frazier, Doug Smith, and Kazuko Tadano.
October 28–30, 2005	Northern Kentucky Convention Center; Covington, Kentucky		Christopher Ayres, Emily DeJesus, Robert DeJesus, Ryan Gavigan, Dan Hess, Jan Scott-Frazier, and Doug Smith.
October 27–29, 2006	Holiday Inn Cincinnati Airport; Erlanger, Kentucky	1,400	Akiko, Christopher Ayres, Greg Ayres, Austell "DJ Asu" Callwood, Emily DeJesus, Robert DeJesus, Dan Hess, Hidenobu Kiuchi, Maro, Jan Scott-Frazier, Doug Smith, and The Spoony Bards.
November 16–18, 2007	Drawbridge Inn; Fort Mitchell, Kentucky		Hannah Alcorn, Christopher Ayres, Greg Ayres, Jennie Breeden, Steve Conte, Emily DeJesus, Robert DeJesus, James Hatton, Dan Hess, Brittney Karbowski, Carli Mosier, Jan Scott-Frazier, Doug Smith, and The Spoony Bards.
October 31 – November 2, 2008	Drawbridge Inn; Fort Mitchell, Kentucky		Christopher Ayres, Greg Ayres, Emily DeJesus, Robert DeJesus, Josh Grelle, James Hatton, Dan Hess, Sofia Mendez, Jan Scott-Frazier, Doug Smith, Richard Townsend, and Shannon Townsend.
October 30 – November 1, 2009	Drawbridge Inn; Fort Mitchell, Kentucky		Christopher Ayres, Greg Ayres, FICE, Josh Grelle, James Hatton, Dan Hess, Brittney Karbowski, Yasuhiro Koshi, Sizu Miyano, Jan Scott-Frazier, Doug Smith, Hideaki Takatori, Nobu Takatori, Richard Townsend, Shannon Townsend, and Voices For.
November 5–7, 2010	Drawbridge Inn; Fort Mitchell, Kentucky		Christopher Ayres, Fred Gallagher, Josh Grelle, James Hatton, Dan Hess, Yasuhiro Koshi, Misato Aki, Sizu Miyano, Carli Mosier, Jan Scott-Frazier, Ian Sinclair, Doug Smith, Shannon Townsend, Voices For, and Shinichi Watanabe.
November 4–6, 2011	Drawbridge Hotel & Convention Center; Fort Mitchell, Kentucky		Christopher Ayres, Greg Ayres, Josh Grelle, James Hatton, Dan Hess, Yasuhiro Koshi, Carli Mosier, Ian Sinclair, Doug Smith, SWEK, Richard Townsend, Shannon Townsend, Shinichi Watanabe, Yamato Nadeshiko.
November 16–18, 2012	Drawbridge Hotel & Convention Center; Fort Mitchell, Kentucky		Yasuhiro Kosh, Sizu Miyano, and Shinichi Watanabe.
November 1-3, 2013	Crowne Plaza Cincinnati North; Sharonville, Ohio		

== Other Related News Articles ==
- Staff writer (January 2006). "Con Report: Sugoi Con". Newtype USA. 5 (1): 99.
- Lillard, Kevin (January 2007). "Con Report: SugoiCon". Newtype USA. 6 (1): 94.
- Little, Aiesha D. (June 2010). "Fun City!: SugoiCon". Cincinnati Magazine.
