= Arkansas Anime Festival =

Anime Convention

Coordinates: 36°10′20″N 94°11′6″W

- Status: Active
- Genre: Anime
- Venue: Holiday Inn Springdale/Fayetteville Area
- Location: Springdale, Arkansas
- Country: United States
- Inaugurated: 2007
- Attendance: 1,208 in March 2012
- Website: http://arkansasanimefestival.com/

Arkansas Anime Festival (A2F) is an annual three-day anime convention held in June/July at the Holiday Inn Springdale/Fayetteville Area in Springdale, Arkansas. It is the largest anime convention in the state of Arkansas and is family friendly.

== Programming ==
The convention typically offers an artists alley, a dance, live action role-playing game, masquerade, panels, tabletop gaming, a vendor room, video games.

== History ==
For several years the convention happened two times per year. The March 2010 event had a free party before the convention. Arkansas Anime Festival 2020 was postponed due to the COVID-19 pandemic.

=== Event history ===
Dates	Location	Atten.	Guests
November 17, 2007	Cosmopolitan Hotel; Fayetteville, Arkansas		Samantha Inoue-Harte
May 24, 2008	Holiday Inn Northwest Arkansas; Springdale, Arkansas	1,121	Tiffany Grant, Samantha Inoue-Harte, and Dominic Vitucci.
November 8–9, 2008	Holiday Inn; Springdale, Arkansas	1,056	Johnny Yong Bosch, Samantha Inoue-Harte, and Dominic Vitucci.
April 25, 2009	Cosmopolitan Hotel; Fayetteville, Arkansas		Kyle Hebert, Samantha Inoue-Harte, and Dominic Vitucci.
November 20–22, 2009	Cosmopolitan Hotel; Fayetteville, Arkansas		Juli Erickson, Samantha Inoue-Harte, and Grant James.
March 6–7, 2010	Clarion Hotel & Conference Center; Bentonville, Arkansas		Christopher Ayres, Todd Haberkorn, Vic Mignogna, Wendy Powell, and Maria Vu.
November 20–21, 2010	Clarion Hotel & Conference Center; Bentonville, Arkansas	900	Robert Axelrod, Richard Epcar, Samantha Inoue-Harte, and Dominic Vitucci.
March 5–6, 2011	Clarion Hotel & Conference Center; Bentonville, Arkansas		DJ Azrael, Eric Benton, Eric Burton, Spike Spencer, and John Swasey.
December 2–4, 2011	Holiday Inn Springdale / Fayetteville Area; Springdale, Arkansas		Jillian Coglan, Samurai Dan Coglan, and Mike McFarland.
March 16–18, 2012	Holiday Inn Springdale / Fayetteville Area; Springdale, Arkansas	1,208	DJ Azrael, Eric Benton, Eric Burton, and Sonny Strait.
November 16–18, 2012	Holiday Inn Springdale / Fayetteville Area; Springdale, Arkansas		Jillian Coglan, Samurai Dan Coglan, Samantha Inoue-Harte, Greg Wicker, and Tom Wyner.
April 5–7, 2013	Holiday Inn Springdale / Fayetteville Area; Springdale, Arkansas		
March 14–16, 2014	Holiday Inn Springdale / Fayetteville Area; Springdale, Arkansas		Chris Bevins, Samantha Inoue-Harte, Rachel Robinson, and J. Michael Tatum.
December 12–14, 2014	Holiday Inn Springdale / Fayetteville Area; Springdale, Arkansas		Leah Clark, Samantha Inoue-Harte, Kazha, Jad Saxton, and Jessica Calvello.
May 29–31, 2015	Holiday Inn Springdale / Fayetteville Area; Springdale, Arkansas		Darrel Guilbeau, David Vincent, and Lisle Wilkerson.
May 27–29, 2016	Holiday Inn Springdale / Fayetteville Area; Springdale, Arkansas		Rachael Messer and Austin Tindle.
November 18–20, 2016	Holiday Inn Springdale / Fayetteville Area; Springdale, Arkansas		Samantha Inoue-Hart, Guy Michel, Phil Parsons, and Chris Patton.
May 26–28, 2017	Fort Smith Convention Center; Fort Smith, Arkansas		Leah Clark and Kazha.
November 10–12, 2017	DoubleTree Suites by Hilton Hotel Bentonville; Four Points by Sheraton Bentonville; Bentonville, Arkansas		Samantha Inoue-Hart
June 29 - July 1, 2018	DoubleTree Suites by Hilton Hotel Bentonville; Four Points by Sheraton Bentonville; Bentonville, Arkansas		DJ Azrael, Fighting Dreamers Productions, Jeremy Inman, and Kazha.
June 21-23, 2019	DoubleTree Suites by Hilton Hotel Bentonville; Four Points by Sheraton Bentonville; Bentonville, Arkansas		Aaron Roberts
June 17-19, 2022	Four Points by Sheraton Bentonville; Bentonville, Arkansas		Kyle Jones, John Swasey, and Barry Yandell.
July 14-16, 2023	Four Points by Sheraton Bentonville; Bentonville, Arkansas		Josh Martin, Phil Parsons, and Chris Rager.
June 7-9, 2024	Four Points by Sheraton Bentonville; Bentonville, Arkansas		Tiffany Grant, Krystal LaPorte, Patrick Pedraza, and Aaron Roberts.
June 27-29, 2025	Holiday Inn Springdale/Fayetteville Area; Springdale, Arkansas		Shawn Gann, Amanda Gish, Marissa Lenti, and Bryan Massey.
