= Sogen Con =

Anime convention

Coordinates: 43°33′45″N 96°44′54″W

- Status: Defunct
- Genre: Anime
- Venue: Sioux Falls Convention Center
- Location: Sioux Falls, South Dakota
- Country: United States
- Inaugurated: 2005
- Organizer: Otaku Incorporated

Sogen Con was an annual three-day anime convention held during the summer months at the Sioux Falls Convention Center in Sioux Falls, South Dakota. It was originally based in Minnesota until moving before the 2007 convention. The name of the convention is based from the Japanese word for prairie, sogen.

== Programming ==
The convention features artists, dances, dealers, panel discussions, Q&A sessions, video games, voice actors, and workshops.

== History ==
In 2011, Sogen Con started a Kickstarter with the goal of raising $15,000 to cover the costs of the convention. The issues stemmed from the organizers (Otaku Incorporated) involvement in two less successful contentions, KakkoiCon and Minneapolis Anime Convention (M.A.C), which had financial and staff issues. The convention was able to successfully raise the money in two weeks.

=== Event history ===
Dates	Location	Atten.	Guests
May 20–22, 2005	Southwest Minnesota State University; Marshall, Minnesota		Christine Auten, Greg Ayres, Johnny Yong Bosch, Luci Christian, Michael Coleman, Emily DeJesus, Robert DeJesus, Tiffany Grant, Kumiko Kato, Wendee Lee, Vic Mignogna, Scott Ramsoomair, Monica Rial, Carrie Savage, Stephanie Sheh, and Travis Willingham.
May 19–21, 2006	Southwest Minnesota State University; Marshall, Minnesota		Greg Ayres, Laura Bailey, Colleen Clinkenbeard, Caitlin Glass, and Mike McFarland.
October 5–7, 2007	Sheraton Sioux Falls & Convention Center; Sioux Falls, South Dakota		Christopher Ayres, Greg Ayres, Johnny Yong Bosch, Michael Coleman, Eyeshine, Crispin Freeman, Tiffany Grant, Kyle Hebert, Taliesin Jaffe, Jan Scott-Frazier, Richard Townsend, and Shannon Townsend.
September 26–28, 2008	Sheraton Sioux Falls & Convention Center; Sioux Falls, South Dakota		Christopher Ayres, Greg Ayres, Jessica Boone, Tiffany Grant, Matt Greenfield, Jan Scott-Frazier, Richard Townsend, and Shannon Townsend.
August 7–9, 2009	Sheraton Sioux Falls & Convention Center; Sioux Falls, South Dakota		Christopher Ayres, Greg Ayres, Fredd Gorham, Josh Grelle, Carli Mosier, Samantha R. Sangster, Tiger Rock Tae Kwon Do Dojo, Richard Townsend, and Shannon Townsend.
July 23–25, 2010	Sheraton Sioux Falls & Convention Center; Sioux Falls, South Dakota		Christopher Ayres, Greg Ayres, Josh Grelle, Cynthia Martinez, Carli Mosier, Tiger Rock Tae Kwon Do Dojo, Richard Townsend, and Shannon Townsend.
August 12–14, 2011	Sheraton Sioux Falls & Convention Center; Sioux Falls, South Dakota		Christopher Ayres and Richard Townsend.
July 20–22, 2012	Sheraton Sioux Falls & Convention Center; Sioux Falls, South Dakota		Christopher Ayres, Nick Landis, Carli Mosier, and SWEK.
August 30 - September 1, 2013	Sioux Falls Convention Center; Sioux Falls, South Dakota		Genius Pi, James Hatton, and Ryan Reynolds.
