= PersaCon =

Anime convention in Alabama, United States

- Status: Defunct
- Venue: Radisson Suite Hotel Huntsville
- Location: Huntsville, Alabama
- Country: United States
- Inaugurated: 2003
- Most recent: 2011
- Major events: Cosplay, Anime Music Video Contest, Video Console Gaming

PersaCon, originally ChibiCon, was an anime convention held in various locations around Alabama. PersaCon was the first anime convention to be held in the state of Alabama.

== Programming ==
PersaCon typically featured costume contests, dances, dealer's room, karaoke contests, live concerts, panels, speed dating, and workshops.

== History ==
The convention moved to the Von Braun Center in 2008 due to continued growth, but did not return to the location due to the cost. Portions of the conventions proceeds in 2010 went towards Operation Anime Storm and Cystic Fibrosis Foundation.

=== Event history ===
Dates	Location	Atten.	Guests
May 2–4, 2003	Radisson Hotel Huntsville Airport; Madison, Alabama		Stephanie Celeste, Stephen K. Chenault, Jonathan Cook, and Jan Scott-Frazier.
April 30 – May 2, 2004	Ramada Inn; Madison, Alabama		Steve Bennett, Stephanie Celeste, Stephen K. Chenault, Michael Coleman, Crystal Gilleland, and Jan Scott-Frazier.
April 29 – May 1, 2005	Ramada Inn; Madison, Alabama		Steve Bennett, Stephanie Celeste, Michael Coleman, Patrick Seitz, and Travis Willingham.
June 2–4, 2006	Ramada Inn; Madison, Alabama		Stephanie Celeste, Michael Coleman, Travis Willingham, Lisa Furukawa, Vic Mignogna, and Patrick Seitz.
June 15–17, 2007	Bevill Conference Center & Hotel; Huntsville, Alabama		Steve Bennett, Stephanie Celeste, Chris Hazelton, Nightmare Armor Studios, Patrick Seitz, and Spike Spencer.
June 27–29, 2008	Von Braun Center; Huntsville, Alabama		Steve Bennett, Stephanie Celeste, C.J. Collins, Yaya Han, The Man Power, Meredith Placko, Patrick Seitz, The Slants, and Tsubaki Stars.
July 24–26, 2009	Holiday Inn Hotel and Suites; Decatur, Alabama	892	Electric Attitude, Kyle Hebert, Walter E. Jones, The Man Power, Mark Musashi, Blake Shepard, and Tsubaki Stars.
June 25–27, 2010	Holiday Inn Hotel and Suites; Decatur, Alabama		Leah Clark, Electric Attitude, Joy Jacobson, The Man Power, Mark Musashi, Wendy Powell, Gordon Roque, Patrick Seitz, Blake Shepard, Tsubaki Stars, and Lisle Wilkerson.
July 15–17, 2011	Radisson Suite Hotel Huntsville; Huntsville, Alabama		Blue Grade, Stephanie Celeste, C.J. Collins, Final Weapon, The Man Power, Michael McConnohie, Mark Musashi, Patrick Seitz, Melodee M. Spevack, Chuck Stroschein, and Brian Woods.
