= KimoKawaii =

Anime convention in Conroe, Texas

Coordinates: 30°21′01.3″N 95°25′47.7″W

- Status: Active
- Genre: Anime, Japanese culture
- Venue: Lone Star Convention & Expo Center
- Location: Conroe, Texas
- Country: United States
- Inaugurated: 2022
- Organizer: Silverback Events
- Website: kimokawaii.net

KimoKawaii (KimoKawaii Anime Experience & Convention) is an annual two-day anime convention held during June at the Lone Star Convention & Expo Center in Conroe, Texas, a suburb of Houston. The convention's name comes the combination of the Japanese words kimoi (meaning creepy) and kawaii (meaning cute.) KimoKawaii's goal is to provide a deeper experience than the average anime convention, and is also family-friendly.

== Programming ==
The convention's programming includes an arcade room, artists, a battle of the bands, cosplay contest, a dance party, exhibitors, fashion show, karaoke, and panels.

A live art auction in 2022 benefited the Texas Children's Hospital.

== History ==
KimoKawaii was founded by Chris Carson. The convention during each event produces new episodes of the original anime Kushi & The Anunnaki.

== Event history ==
Dates	Location	Atten.	Guests
June 4-5, 2022	Lone Star Convention & Expo Center; Conroe, Texas		Elise Baughman, Cynthia Cranz, Lana Marie, Josh Martin, Chris Rager, and Adachi Trieu.
June 3-4, 2023	Lone Star Convention & Expo Center; Conroe, Texas		Bob Bergen, Chris Patton, Tyler Walker, Charmie Cosplay, Peachy & Fairy, and Pocketsize Cosplay.
June 1-2, 2024	Lone Star Convention & Expo Center; Conroe, Texas		Melanie Kohn, Alyson Leigh Rosenfeld, John Simons.
June 7-8, 2025	Lone Star Convention & Expo Center; Conroe, Texas		Tiffany Grant, Annie Wild, Bradley William Smith, Jeremy Gee, Mauricio Ortiz-Segura, and Corey Wilder.
June 6-7, 2026	Lone Star Convention & Expo Center; Conroe, Texas		AllieCat, Cynthia Cranz, Adam Gibbs, Carrie Savage, Lindsay Sheppard, Lara Woodhull, Jacob Eiseman, Meggie-Elise, Mary Morgan, C.J. Peterson, John Simons, Bradley Smith, Ezra Vervin, and Eduardo Vildasol.

== KimoKawaii College Station ==
KimoKawaii College Station is a one-day anime convention held during April at the Hilton College Station & Conference Center in College Station, Texas.

=== Event history ===
Dates	Location	Atten.	Guests
April 18, 2026	Hilton College Station & Conference Center; College Station, Texas		Carrie Savage and Lindsay Sheppard.
