= Manifest (convention) =

Defunct anime convention in Australia

Manifest (Melbourne Anime Festival)
- Status: Defunct
- Venue: Melbourne Showgrounds
- Location: Victoria
- Country: Australia
- Inaugurated: 2000
- Most recent: 2013
- Attendance: 9,000 as 2011

Melbourne Anime Festival, colloquially known as "Manifest", was a three-day fan convention held in Melbourne, Australia. It focused on the art of anime and manga, East Asian culture, and its associated fandoms. Manifest was held at the Parkville campus of the University of Melbourne until 2009, when it moved to the Melbourne Showgrounds. It was held in August each year. Following the 2013 convention, Manifest closed.

Manifest was run by the not-for-profit organisation MAFI (Melbourne Anime Festival Inc.) and staffed entirely by volunteers. The organising committee held regular meetings to plan and organise the event, and was made up of 30-75 people. In addition, more than a hundred individuals volunteered their time on the event weekend to help run the convention.

== History ==
Manifest was originally held at the University of Melbourne until 2009, when it moved to the Melbourne Showgrounds. On 1 December 2013, it was announced that Manifest would not be running again in 2014 due to financial and staffing issues.

=== Event history ===
Dates	Location	Attendance
11–12 October 2001	Melbourne University; Old Arts Building; Melbourne, Australia	
10–11 August 2002	Melbourne University; Melbourne, Australia	
8–10 August 2003	University of Melbourne; Economics and Commerce Building; Melbourne, Australia	
14–15 August 2004	University of Melbourne; Parkville Campus; Melbourne, Australia	
23–25 September 2005	University of Melbourne; Parkville Campus; Melbourne, Australia	
22–24 September 2006	University of Melbourne; Parkville Campus; Melbourne, Australia	3,500 (estimated)
14–16 September 2007	University of Melbourne; Parkville Campus; Melbourne, Australia	4,400 (estimated)
26–28 September 2008	University of Melbourne; Parkville Campus; Melbourne, Australia	4,800 (estimated)
21–23 August 2009	Melbourne Showgrounds; Melbourne, Australia	6,750 (estimated)
20–22 August 2010	Melbourne Showgrounds; Melbourne, Australia	
26–28 August 2011	Melbourne Showgrounds; Melbourne, Australia	8,900 (estimated)
17–19 August 2012	Melbourne Showgrounds; Melbourne, Australia	
16–18 August 2013	Melbourne Showgrounds; Melbourne, Australia	

== See also ==
- List of anime conventions
