= Ikasucon =

Anime convention in Fort Wayne, Indiana, United States

Coordinates: 41°4′35″N 85°8′25″W

- Status: Inactive
- Genre: Anime, Manga, Video Games, and Japanese popular culture.
- Venue: Grand Wayne Convention Center
- Location: Fort Wayne, Indiana
- Country: United States
- Inaugurated: 2003
- Attendance: 1,500 in 2009

Ikasucon was an annual three-day anime convention held during July at the Grand Wayne Convention Center in Fort Wayne, Indiana. The name of the convention has no particular meaning.

== Programming ==
The convention typically offered anime improv, anime music video contest, chess, costume competitions, game shows, gaming tournaments, formal dance, karaoke, original animation contest, panels, rave, vendors, workshops, and video screenings.

== History ==
Ikasucon was previously held in the Cincinnati, Ohio area until moving to Fort Wayne, Indiana in 2007 for better facilities.

=== Event history ===
| Dates | Location | Atten. | Guests |
|---|---|---|---|
| July 25–27, 2003 | Cincinnati Convention Center; Cincinnati, Ohio | | Steve Bennett, Emily DeJesus, Robert DeJesus, Monica Rial, and Jan Scott-Frazier. |
| July 16–18, 2004 | Clarion Hotel; Blue Ash, Ohio | 886 | Greg Ayres, Steve Bennett, Emily DeJesus, Robert DeJesus, Yad-Ming Mui, and Jan Scott-Frazier. |
| July 15–17, 2005 | Clarion Hotel; Blue Ash, Ohio | 1,300 | Greg Ayres, Steve Bennett, Emily DeJesus, Robert DeJesus, Hilary Hatch, Yad-Ming Mui, Michael Poe, Jan Scott-Frazier, and Toshifumi Yoshida. |
| July 14–16, 2006 | The Cinergy Center; Cincinnati, Ohio | | Greg Ayres, Emily DeJesus, Robert DeJesus, Michael Gluck, David Kaye, Yad-Ming Mui, Jan Scott-Frazier, Toshifumi Yoshida, and Steve Yun. |
| August 10–12, 2007 | Grand Wayne Convention Center; Fort Wayne, Indiana | | Tristan MacAvery, Kevin McKeever, Yad-Ming Mui, Jan Scott-Frazier, and Toshifumi Yoshida. |
| July 18–20, 2008 | Grand Wayne Convention Center; Fort Wayne, Indiana | | Emily DeJesus, Robert DeJesus, Tristan MacAvery, Jeremy Mauney, Kevin McKeever, Harlan Watkins, and Mariah Watkins. |
| August 7–9, 2009 | Grand Wayne Convention Center; Fort Wayne, Indiana | 1,500 | Jeremy Mauney, Wendy Powell, Harlan Watkins, Mariah Watkins, and Travis Willingham. |
| July 16–18, 2010 | Grand Wayne Convention Center; Fort Wayne, Indiana | | Hilary Hatch, Michael Poe, Spike Spencer, and Sonny Strait. |
| July 8–10, 2011 | Grand Wayne Convention Center; Fort Wayne, Indiana | | Hilary Hatch, Jamie McGonnigal, Steve "Warky" Nunez, Michael Poe, Blake Shepard, Sonny Strait, and Eric Stuart. |
| July 13–15, 2012 | Grand Wayne Convention Center; Fort Wayne, Indiana | | Daniel Coglan, Jillian Coglan, Steve Horton, Jamie McGonnigal, Steve "Warky" Nunez, Michael Poe, Blake Shepard, Sonny Strait, and Eric Stuart. |
| July 12-14, 2013 | Grand Wayne Convention Center; Fort Wayne, Indiana | | Abracadabra Productions |
| August 1-3, 2014 | Grand Wayne Convention Center; Fort Wayne, Indiana | | Robert Axelrod, James Hatton, Scott McNeil, Blake Shepard, Greg Wicker, Eric Wile, and Lisle Wilkerson. |
| July 10-12, 2015 | Grand Wayne Convention Center; Fort Wayne, Indiana | | Jeremy Inman and Blake Shepard. |
| July 8-10, 2016 | Grand Wayne Convention Center; Fort Wayne, Indiana | | James Hatton, Aaron Roberts, Blake Shepard, Austin Tindle, and Greg Wicker. |
| July 28-30, 2017 | Grand Wayne Convention Center; Fort Wayne, Indiana | | Quinton Flynn, Michele Knotz, Daman Mills, and Aaron Roberts. |
