= SoDak Con =

Annual three-day anime convention in South Dakota

Coordinates: 44°5′18.74″N 103°13′32.94″W

- Status: Defunct
- Genre: Anime, Japanese popular culture
- Venue: Rushmore Plaza Civic Center
- Location: Rapid City, South Dakota
- Country: United States
- Inaugurated: 2009
- Most recent: 2018
- Attendance: 600 in 2011
- Website: http://www.sdcon.org/

SoDak Con formerly called SoDak Anime Convention, was an annual three-day anime convention held during May/June at the Rushmore Plaza Civic Center in Rapid City, South Dakota. The name of the convention comes from the state that the convention is located in, South Dakota.

== Programming ==
The convention typically offered art, a charity auction, costume contest, fashion, Japanese fashion show, music videos, speakers, table-top gaming, vendors, video games, and a video room.

== History ==
The convention origins date to the Waldenbooks in the Rushmore Mall. In 2011 an auction was held and the proceeds were donated to the Children's Miracle Network. Fifty percent of the attendees in 2013 were not from the area.

=== Event history ===
Dates	Location	Atten.	Guests
January 18, 2009	Holiday Inn Rapid City-Rushmore Plaza; Rapid City, South Dakota		
January 23–24, 2010	Rushmore Plaza Civic Center; Rapid City, South Dakota	300 (est)	Wendy Powell and Vic Mignogna.
January 15–16, 2011	Best Western Ramkota Rapid City Hotel & Conference Center; Rapid City, South Dakota	600 (est)	Todd Haberkorn and Wendy Powell.
June 15–17, 2012	Rushmore Plaza Civic Center; Rapid City, South Dakota		Joshua Adams, Cris George, Jeremy Inman, and Uke Li.
June 21–23, 2013	Rushmore Plaza Civic Center; Rapid City, South Dakota	3,000+	Cynthia Cranz, Samantha R. Crossland, Rob "Vash" Lewis, Wendy Powell, and Tom Rasch.
May 30 - June 1, 2014	Rushmore Plaza Civic Center; Rapid City, South Dakota		Tom Rasch, Cris George, Jeremy Inman, C.W. LaSart, Adrian Ludens, Doug Murano, and Tyson Rinehart.
June 19–21, 2015	Rushmore Plaza Civic Center; Rapid City, South Dakota		Chris Bevins, Callie Jiang, Kaai, Adrian Ludens, Carl Martin, Doug Murano, Wendy Powell, Tom Rasch, Rachel Robinson, Chantelle Tatum, Richard Townsend, Shannon Townsend, and Warumono.
June 24-26, 2016	Rushmore Plaza Civic Center; Rapid City, South Dakota		Dante Basco, Callie Jiang, Kaai, Lauren Landa, Adrian Ludens, Kevin McKeever, and Doug Murano.
June 23-25, 2017	Rushmore Plaza Civic Center; Rapid City, South Dakota		Leah Clark, Rob "Vash" Lewis, Adrian Ludens, Kevin McKeever, Bailey Ordiway, Random Encounters, and Teca.
June 29 - July 1, 2018	Rushmore Plaza Civic Center; Rapid City, South Dakota		Carl Martin and Wendy Powell.
