= Anime Conji =

Annual anime convention in San Diego, California

Coordinates: 32°45′55″N 117°9′1″W

- Status: Inactive
- Genre: Anime, Manga
- Venue: San Diego Marriott Mission Valley
- Location: San Diego, California
- Country: United States
- Inaugurated: 2010
- Organizer: San Diego Speculative Fiction Society, Inc. (SanSFiS)

Anime Conji was an annual three-day anime convention held during May/June at the San Diego Marriott Mission Valley in San Diego, California.

== Programming ==
The convention typically offered anime screenings, AMV contest, an art show, artist alley, a dance, dealers, fashion show, gaming, karaoke, Maid Café, masquerade, and panels.

== History ==
The convention became part of SPJA (Society for the Promotion of Japanese Animation), the organizers of Anime Expo in March 2012. During the 2015 convention, NIS America held a Danganronpa based murder mystery. Anime Conji 2016 was cancelled due to event quality concerns. The convention returned in 2018 under its original organizers, the San Diego Speculative Fiction Society (SanSFiS). Anime Conji did not occur in 2020 due to budget and venue issues.

=== Event history ===
Dates	Location	Atten.	Guests
April 9–11, 2010	Doubletree Hotel San Diego-Mission Valley; San Diego, California	500 (cap)	Jon Allen.
March 25–27, 2011	Town and Country Resort Hotel; San Diego, California		Jon Allen, The Black Crystals, Julie Rei Goldstein, Kyle Hebert, Traci Hines, Reuben Langdon, Danielle McRae, Mandy Mefford, Walter G. Meyer, Patrick Seitz, Steam Powered Giraffe, Jonathan Tarbox, Tadao Tomomatsu, and Stephen Weese.
March 16–18, 2012	Town and Country Resort Hotel; San Diego, California		Jon Allen, Frances Delgado, Yukie Dong, Karen Dyer, David Lee Gallagher, Jacob Grady, Crystal Graziano, Todd Graziano, Kirby's Dream Band, Emiko Kiyochi, George Krstic, Billy Martinez, Danielle McRae, Psycho Bando, Raj Ramayya, Tadao Tomomatsu, Robert Trebor, Cristina Vee, and Stephen Weese.
April 12–14, 2013	Town and Country Resort Hotel; San Diego, California		Edward Bosco, Lucien Dodge, Cyril Lumboy, Danielle McRae, Cassandra Lee Morris, Psycho Bando, Raj Ramayya, Stephen Weese, Ezra Weisz, and Sarah Anne Williams.
April 18–20, 2014	Sheraton San Diego Hotel & Marina; San Diego, California		Chris Cason, Ben Diskin, Eyeshine, Kyle Hebert, Maridah, Vic Mignogna, and Usako.
April 3–5, 2015	Sheraton San Diego Hotel & Marina; San Diego, California		Aicosu, Chocolate Covered Cosplay, Ben Diskin, Jess Harnell, Kyle Hebert, Erin Lee, Vincent Martella, Chris Niosi, and Chii Sakurabi.
June 1–3, 2018	Sheraton Mission Valley San Diego Hotel; San Diego, California		Morgan Berry, Mary Claypool, Les E. Claypool, Victor Frost, Kyle Hebert, Lia Sargent, Paul St. Peter, and Ezra Weisz.
May 31 – June 2, 2019	San Diego Marriott Mission Valley; San Diego, California		Dorah Fine, Aki Glancy, Kimlinh Tran, Vocamerica, Steve Yun, and Tommy Yune.

== See also ==
- Anime Expo
