= QC Anime-zing! =

Anime convention in the United States

Coordinates: 41.522°N 90.572°W

- Status: Active
- Venue: Clarion Hotel Conference Center
- Location: Davenport, Iowa
- Country: United States
- Inaugurated: 2010
- Website: http://www.qcanimezing.com/

QC Anime-zing! is an anime convention organized in the Quad Cities, United States. The convention offers anime screenings, video games, a dealers' room, guest panels, fan panels, cosplay competitions, and other events typical of an anime convention. It was first held at The Lodge Hotel in Bettendorf, IA, from June 18–20, 2010. Guests for the 2010 convention included Johnny Yong Bosch, Robert Axelrod, Spike Spencer, Eyeshine, and The Man Power. The 2011 convention took place from June 17–19, 2011, at The RiverCenter in Davenport, Iowa.

== Programming ==
QC Anime-zing! Runs for three days, featuring events throughout the weekend.

- Anime Screenings - The convention screens various anime series in screening rooms.
- Artist's Alley - Artists have the opportunity to sell or display their artwork.
- ConSuite - A hospitality suite with free rice, ramen, and other snack foods.
- Cosplay Contest - Visitors can compete to see whose costume is the best.
- Dealer's Room - Outside, vendors sell their products, including video games or anime-related goods and Japanese snacks.
- Guests of Honor - Voice actors and musicians appear, perform, sign autographs and interact with fans.
- Rave - An official dance event that lasts late into Saturday night.
- Video Games - Video games and tournaments are organized throughout the weekend.

== History ==
=== Event history ===
Dates	Location	Atten.	Guests
June 18–20, 2010	The Lodge Hotel and Conference Center; Bettendorf, Iowa		Robert Axelrod, Johnny Yong Bosch, Eyeshine, The Man Power, and Spike Spencer.
June 17–19, 2011	RiverCenter; Davenport, Iowa		Robert Axelrod, John Bivens, Johnny Yong Bosch, Daniel Coglan, Jillian Coglan, Eyeshine, Russell Lissau, Trevor A. Mueller, and Spike Spencer.
June 1–3, 2012	Clarion Hotel Conference Center; Davenport, Iowa		Robert Axelrod, John Bivens, Johnny Yong Bosch, Alan Evans, Eyeshine, Sonny Strait, V is for Villains, and Cristina Vee.
May 3–5, 2013	Clarion Hotel Conference Center; Davenport, Iowa		Dr. Awkward, Greg Ayres, Bea Billany, Daniel Coglan, Jillian Coglan, Quinton Flynn, and Sonny Strait.
July 11–13, 2014	The RiverCenter; Davenport, Iowa		D.C. Douglas, The Eric Stuart Band, Caitlin Glass, Eric Stuart, and V is for Villains.
July 17–19, 2015	The RiverCenter; Davenport, Iowa		D.C. Douglas, Anna Ito, John Stocker, and Greg Wicker.
July 15-17, 2016	The RiverCenter; Davenport, Iowa		Greg Wicker, Jillian Coglan, Dan Coglan, Chuck Huber, London Has Fallen, Vic Mignogna, Derek Stephen Prince, Paul St. Peter, John Stocker, and V is for Villains.
July 14-16, 2017	Raddison Quad City Plaza Hotel; Davenport, Iowa		Greg Wicker, Jillian Coglan, Dan Coglan, Greg Ayres, Kid Yuki and the Otakus, Clifford Chapin, Jay Hickman, Aaron Roberts, and V is for Villains.
July 13-15, 2018	RiverCenter; Davenport, Iowa		Greg Wicker, Greg Ayres, Tyler Walker, Dawn M. Bennett, D.C. Douglas, Heather Walker, and V is for Villains.
August 2-4, 2019	RiverCenter; Davenport, Iowa		R. Bruce Elliott, Greg Ayres, Andy Field, Brittany Lauda, D.C. Douglas, Trevor A. Mueller, Whitney Rodgers, Matt Shipman and John Swasey.
August 2-4, 2020	RiverCenter; Davenport, Iowa		Jillian Coglan, Dan Coglan, Chuck Huber, Gigi Edgeley, and Gareth West.
July 30-August 1, 2021	RiverCenter; Davenport, Iowa		Jillian Coglan, Dan Coglan, John Swasey, Chuck Huber, Greg Ayres, Anna Ito, Jay Hickman, and Quinton Flinn.
August 5-7, 2022	RiverCenter; Davenport, Iowa		Jillian Coglan, Dan Coglan, John Swasey, Olivia Swasey, Rob Mungle, Greg Ayres, Anna Ito, and Gareth West.
August 11-13, 2023	RiverCenter; Davenport, Iowa		Jillian Coglan, Dan Coglan, Greg Ayres, Jay Hickman, Gareth West, and Quinton Flinn.
August 9-11, 2024	Holiday Inn Rock Island; Rock Island, Illinois		Jillian Coglan, Dan Coglan, and Greg Ayres.

== Anime-Zap! ==
QC Anime-zing! is particularly known for organizing an 'instant' anime convention after a small nearby convention, Pokettokon, was cancelled less than a week before the convention weekend. This last-minute event attracted 160 attendees with less than 72 hours of planning.

=== Event history ===
Dates	Location	Atten.	Guests
January 16–17, 2010	Hampton Inn Peoria-East At The River Boat Crossing; East Peoria, Illinois	160	
January 15–16, 2011	Holiday Inn City Centre; Peoria, Illinois		
January 7–8, 2012	Four Points by Sheraton Peoria Downtown; Peoria, Illinois		Daniel Coglan and Jillian Coglan.
January 4–6, 2013	Four Points by Sheraton Peoria Downtown; Peoria, Illinois		Cascade Nightmare, Daniel Coglan, Jillian Coglan, and V is for Villains.
January 3–5, 2014	Embassy Suites East Peoria Hotel & Riverfront Conference Center; East Peoria, Illinois		Airship O'Reilly, The Asterplace, The Audio Pool, Greg Ayres, The Black Roses, Daniel Coglan, Jillian Coglan, Chuck Huber, John Swasey, and V is for Villains.
January 2–4, 2015	Embassy Suites East Peoria Hotel & Riverfront Conference Center; East Peoria, Illinois		D.C. Douglas and Greg Wicker.

== Anime-Spark! ==
QC Anime-zing! announced another second anime convention, Anime-SPARK!, to be held in Cedar Rapids, Iowa, on Valentine's Day weekend.

=== Event history ===
Dates	Location	Atten.	Guests
February 10–14, 2011	Clarion Hotel & Convention Center; Cedar Rapids, Iowa		Daniel Coglan, Jillian Coglan, Quinton Flynn, and Chris Rager.
February 16–19, 2012	Clarion Hotel & Convention Center; Cedar Rapids, Iowa		Aegis Academy of Swordsmanship, Quinton Flynn, Chris Rager, and Greg Wicker.

== Controversies ==
Ryan Kopf, the organizer behind QC Anime-zing!, Anime-Zap!, Anime-Spark!, and several other conventions, was banned from Anime Milwaukee during the 2018 convention due to a sexual assault allegation involving the Milwaukee Police Department. Kopf was at the convention as part of his other event, Anime Midwest and denies the allegations.

On December 14, 2015, Ryan Kopf sued Trae Dorn and Christopher Sturz of the Nerd & Tie website for defamation. The case was dismissed in October 2022 for "failure to prosecute" when Kopf failed to present evidence. On May 17, 2023, the defendants filed for sanctions against Kopf, citing 15 witnesses willing to testify about sexual assault by Ryan Kopf. The filing cited incidents of rape, molestation, and sexual assault.

In November 2021, it was revealed that convention attendees for QC Anime-zing!, Anime-Zap!, Anime-Spark!, and any other conventions which had used the registration system developed by Ryan Kopf had also been signed up for his anime-themed dating website, MaiOtaku. People, including minors, had been added without consent, and profiles were publicly visible on the dating site. Ryan Kopf claimed it was part of a "Single Sign On" system and denied that users' personal information was shared outside the scope of the site's privacy policy, and claimed that users were creating the profiles in their attempts to search for them on the system. MaiOtaku's privacy policy page made no direct reference to AnimeCon.org or the associated conventions.
