= NashiCon =

Anime convention

Coordinates: 34°1′55″N 81°7′7″W

- Status: Inactive
- Genre: Anime, Japanese popular culture
- Venue: DoubleTree by Hilton Hotel Columbia, South Carolina
- Location: Columbia, South Carolina
- Country: United States
- Inaugurated: 2008
- Attendance: 2,300 in 2019
- Organizer: NASHI (Nippon Animation Society of Heavenly Imagery)

NashiCon was an annual three-day anime convention held traditionally during March/April at the DoubleTree by Hilton Hotel Columbia, South Carolina in Columbia, South Carolina. It was the first anime convention in South Carolina and Nashi stands for Nippon Anime Society of Heavenly Imagery.

== Programming ==
The convention typically offered an anime viewing room, artists alley, cosplay ball, dance, human board game (OTAKU - Oversized Tangential All-Consuming Kaleidoscopic Universe), panels, table top gaming, and video gaming. The Carolina Manga Library evolved out of NashiCon 2013 and provided the convention's manga library in 2014.

== History ==
The first convention held in 2008 attracted 200+ attendees. They relocated venues to the Columbia Metropolitan Convention Center in 2012. NashiCon became a three-day convention in 2015.

=== Event History ===
Dates	Location	Atten.	Guests
April 11, 2009	University of South Carolina, Columbia Campus; Columbia, South Carolina	200 (est)	Northrup Davis and Thor Thorvaldson, Jr.
April 17–18, 2010	University of South Carolina, Columbia Campus; Columbia, South Carolina	400 (est)	Sean McGuinness, Morgan Skye, and Thor Thorvaldson, Jr.
March 19–20, 2011	University of South Carolina, Columbia Campus; Columbia, South Carolina	900 (est)	Kittyhawk, Sean McGuinness, Morgan Skye, and Thor Thorvaldson, Jr.
March 31-April 1, 2012	Columbia Metropolitan Convention Center; Columbia, South Carolina	1,100 (est)	Kittyhawk, Sean McGuinness, Morgan Skye, Spike Spencer, and Thor Thorvaldson, Jr.
April 13–14, 2013	Columbia Metropolitan Convention Center; Columbia, South Carolina	1,300 (est)	Laugh Out Loud, Sean McGuinness, Mega Ran, and Thor Thorvaldson, Jr.
April 19–20, 2014	Columbia Metropolitan Convention Center; Columbia, South Carolina	1,800 (est)	Robert Axelrod, Cir9, Laugh Out Loud, Sean McGuinness, Mega Ran, K Murdock, Seraphina, Thor Thorvaldson, Jr., Greg Wicker, and Lisle Wilkerson.
April 17–19, 2015	Columbia Metropolitan Convention Center; Columbia, South Carolina	2,334	Cir9, Kyle Hebert, Laugh Out Loud, Sean McGuinness, Spike Spencer, and Thor Thorvaldson, Jr.
April 1–3, 2016	Columbia Metropolitan Convention Center; Columbia, South Carolina	2,500 (est.)	Kittyhawk, Lauren Landa, Tony Oliver, Thor Thorvaldson, Jr., and David Vincent.
March 31 - April 2, 2017	Columbia Metropolitan Convention Center; Columbia, South Carolina	2,700 (est.)	Kira Buckland, Kyle Hebert, None Like Joshua, Derek Stephen Prince, SkyBlew, and Thor Thorvaldson, Jr.
March 23–25, 2018	Columbia Metropolitan Convention Center; Columbia, South Carolina	2,700 (est.)	Mega Ran, Erica Mendez, Miku-tan, None Like Joshua, and Lisle Wilkerson.
April 5-7, 2019	Columbia Metropolitan Convention Center; Columbia, South Carolina	2,300 (est.)	Chalk Twins, Brittany Lauda, Matt Shipman, and Christopher Wehkamp.
February 14-16, 2020	DoubleTree by Hilton Hotel Columbia, South Carolina; Columbia, South Carolina		AmaLee, Jād Saxton, and Sarah Wiedenheft.
