= Aurora-Con =

Anime convention in Anchorage, Alaska

- Status: Disbanded
- Venue: William A. Egan Civic and Convention Center
- Location: Anchorage, Alaska
- Country: United States
- Inaugurated: 2006
- Most recent: 2008
- Attendance: 1,348 in 2007
- Organizer: AuroraCorp

Aurora-Con was an anime convention held in Anchorage, Alaska at the William A. Egan Civic and Convention Center. It was the first of such conventions to be held at that venue. The convention had a total run of three years.

== History ==
The convention held a fundraiser on November 19, 2005, at the Northway Mall called Gamers Nostalgia to help raise funds toward holding the first Aurora-Con. The convention ceased operations after 2008 due to an lack of volunteers and other unspecified problems.

=== Event history ===
Dates	Location	Atten.	Guests
July 14, 2006	William A. Egan Civic and Convention Center; Anchorage, Alaska	684	Tom Bateman, Chris Sabat, and Brett Weaver.
September 23, 2007	William A. Egan Civic and Convention Center; Anchorage, Alaska	1,348	Lisa Furukawa, Tiffany Grant, Matt Greenfield, Spike Spencer, and Brett Uher.
September 27–28, 2008	William A. Egan Civic and Convention Center; Anchorage, Alaska		Colleen Clinkenbeard, Vic Mignogna, and Brett Uher.
