= OMGcon =

Anime/gaming convention in Kentucky, US

Coordinates: 37°46′28.8″N 87°06′59.3″W

- Status: Active
- Genre: Anime, video gaming
- Venue: Owensboro Convention Center
- Location: Owensboro, Kentucky
- Country: United States
- Inaugurated: 2006
- Attendance: 2,506 in 2019
- Organizer: Tri-State Anime Promotional Society
- Filing status: 501(c)(3)
- Website: www.omgcon.com

OMGcon (sometimes stylized as OMG!con) is a three-day anime convention held during June at the Owensboro Convention Center in Owensboro, Kentucky. The convention was previously held in Paducah, Kentucky. The name of the convention comes from the common abbreviation of Oh My God. OMGcon is run by volunteers.

== Programming ==
The convention typically offers an artist alley, card tournaments, cosplay events, dance/rave, dealers, formal dance, LARPing, special guests, tabletop gaming, video game tournaments, and workshops.

OMGcon's 2016 raffle benefited the charity Cliff Hagan Boys and Girls Club, and raised around $4,000.

== History ==
OMGcon was started because of the long travel time needed to attend other conventions. The convention moved to the Owensboro Convention Center in Owensboro, Kentucky for 2014 onwards. The decision was made to allow for the convention's growth. The Owenboro Convention Center had to be evacuated during the 2015 convention due to a bomb threat. In 2016, the convention began using space in the Holiday Inn for workshops. OMGcon also used all available space in the convention center, with its attendees and other events occupying every hotel room in Owensboro, Kentucky. In 2017, OMGcon again used the entire convention center, and all of Owensboro 1,369 hotel rooms were occupied.

OMGcon 2020 was cancelled due to the COVID-19 pandemic. OMGcon 2021 was also cancelled due to the COVID-19 pandemic. Online conventions were held in 2020 and 2021. OMGcon held HallOMGween over Halloween weekend 2021 at the Owensboro Convention Center and Towneplace Suites. The convention in 2022 had a mask policy.

=== List by year ===
Dates	Location	Atten.	Guests
June 9–11, 2006	JR's Executive Inn Riverfront; Paducah, Kentucky	260	Greg Ayres
May 25–27, 2007	JR's Executive Inn Riverfront; Paducah, Kentucky	380	Greg Ayres, Luci Christian, Emily DeJesus, and Robert DeJesus.
June 6–8, 2008	JR's Executive Inn Riverfront; Paducah, Kentucky	660	Robert V. Aldrich, Christopher Ayres, Greg Ayres, Emily DeJesus, and Robert DeJesus.
June 5–7, 2009	Julian Carrol Convention Center; Paducah, Kentucky	1,100	Christopher Ayres, Greg Ayres, Emily DeJesus, and Robert DeJesus.
June 11–13, 2010	Julian Carrol Convention Center; Paducah, Kentucky	1,220	Christopher Ayres, Greg Ayres, Emily DeJesus, Robert DeJesus, Jessie James Grelle, Rikki Simons, and Tavisha Wolfgarth-Simons.
June 3–5, 2011	Julian Carrol Convention Center; Paducah, Kentucky	1,275	Christopher Ayres, Greg Ayres, Emily DeJesus, Robert DeJesus, Rikki Simons, Eric Stuart, and Tavisha Wolfgarth-Simons.
June 8–10, 2012	Julian Carrol Convention Center; Paducah, Kentucky	1,300	Christopher Ayres, Greg Ayres, Emily DeJesus, Robert DeJesus, Jessie James Grelle, Bill Rogers, Rikki Simons, and Tavisha Wolfgarth-Simons.
June 14–16, 2013	Julian Carrol Convention Center; Paducah, Kentucky	1,380	Christopher Ayres, Greg Ayres, Emily DeJesus, Robert DeJesus, Tiffany Grant, Matt Greenfield, Steve Johnson, Rikki Simons, and Tavisha Wolfgarth-Simons.
June 13–15, 2014	Owensboro Convention Center; Owensboro, Kentucky	1,739	Christopher Ayres, Greg Ayres, Emily DeJesus, Robert DeJesus, Jessie James Grelle, Darrel Guilbeau, Steve Johnson, Rikki Simons, St. Louis Osuwa Taiko, and Tavisha Wolfgarth-Simons.
June 12–14, 2015	Owensboro Convention Center; Owensboro, Kentucky	2,500	Greg Ayres, Gavin Hammon, Melissa Hutchison, Steve Johnson, Xander Mobus, Carter Newton, Rikki Simons, and Tavisha Wolfgarth-Simons.
June 10–12, 2016	Owensboro Convention Center; Owensboro, Kentucky	3,137	Felecia Angelle, Greg Ayres, Erika Harlacher, Allyssa Lewis, Xander Mobus, NateWantsToBattle, Robert J. Schwalb, Rikki Simons, Sarah Anne Williams, and Tavisha Wolfgarth-Simons.
June 9–11, 2017	Owensboro Convention Center; Owensboro, Kentucky	3,740	Dino Andrade, Felecia Angelle, Greg Ayres, Bea Billany, Shirley Curry, Emily DeJesus, Fighting Dreamers Productions, Briana Lawrence, Xander Mobus, Carli Mosier, Rikki Simons, Jessica Walsh, Gareth West, and Tavisha Wolfgarth-Simons.
June 8–10, 2018	Owensboro Convention Center; Owensboro, Kentucky		Greg Ayres, Andrea Caprotti, Emily DeJesus, Robert DeJesus, Rachelle Heger, Caleb Hyles, Comfort Love, Marin M. Miller, Carli Mosier, Bill Rogers, and Adam Withers.
June 7–9, 2019	Owensboro Convention Center; Owensboro, Kentucky	2,506	Greg Ayres, Emily DeJesus, Robert DeJesus, Rikki Simons, Michael Sinterniklaas, and Tavisha Wolfgarth-Simons.
October 30–31, 2021	Owensboro Convention Center; Towneplace Suites; Owensboro, Kentucky	500 (est.)	
June 24–26, 2022	Owensboro Convention Center; Owensboro, Kentucky		Greg Ayres, Dawn M. Bennett, Fighting Dreamers Productions, Xander Mobus, Michael Sinterniklaas, Callon B, Robert DeJesus, Emily DeJesus, and Nintendrew.
June 9-11, 2023	Owensboro Convention Center; Owensboro, Kentucky		Greg Ayres, Jennifer Cihi, Colossal Senpai, Caleb Hyles, Rikki Simons, and Tavisha Wolfgarth-Simons.
June 14-16, 2024	Owensboro Convention Center; Owensboro, Kentucky		Greg Ayres, Bea Billany, Caleb Hyles, Marin M. Miller, and Michael Sinterniklaas.
June 20-22, 2025	Owensboro Convention Center; Owensboro, Kentucky		Greg Ayres, Caleb Hyles, Kevin Miller, and Yoshi Vu.
June 12-14, 2026	Owensboro Convention Center; Owensboro, Kentucky		Greg Ayres, Carli Mosier, Rikki Simons, Jon St. John, Charles Urbach, Brian Watts, and Tavisha Wolfgarth-Simons.
