= Yunyu =

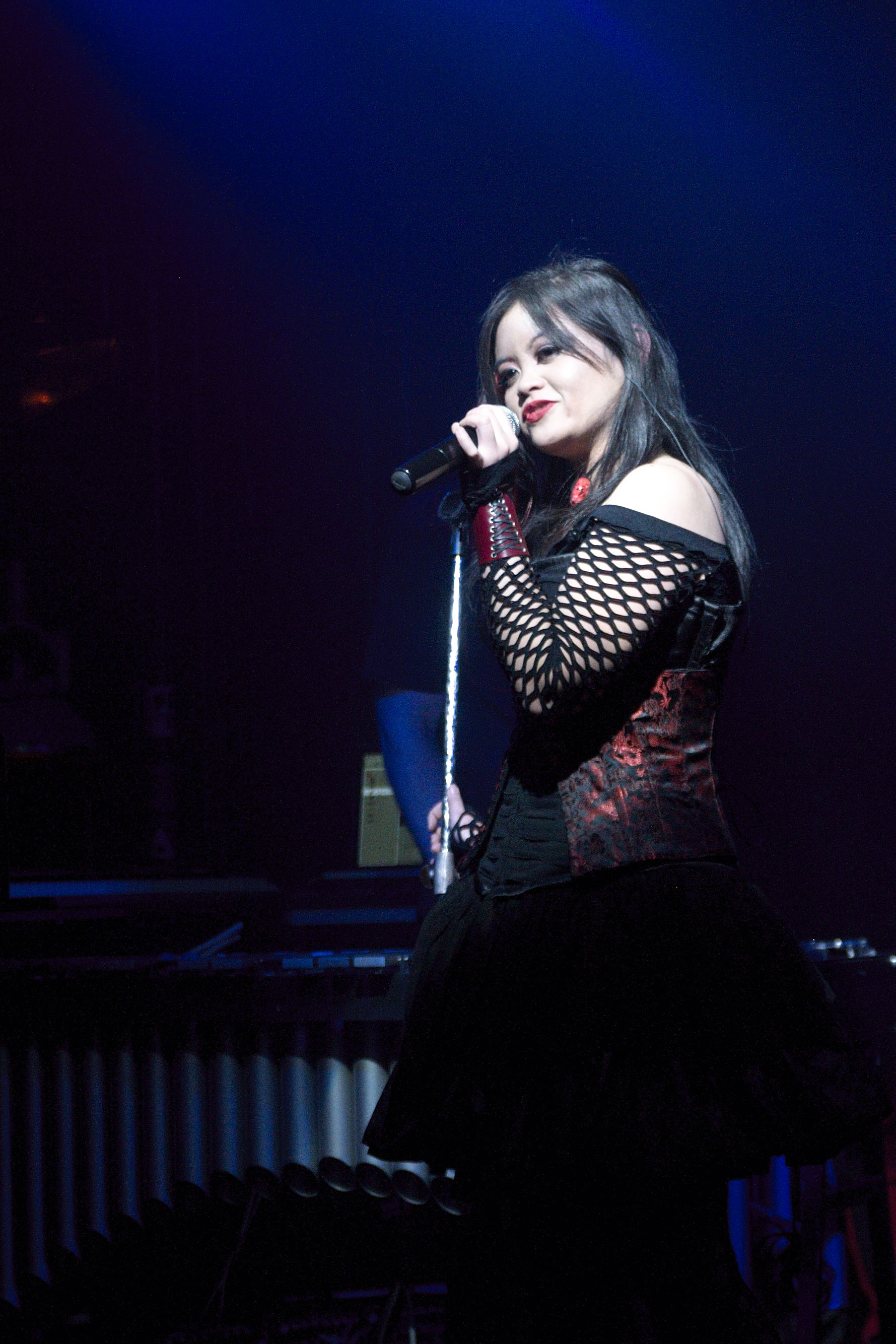
- Yunyu at The Revolver in Melbourne, 22 June 2012

Background information
- Born: Singapore
- Occupations: Singer-songwriter, composer
- Instruments: Vocals, Keyboard, Synthesizer, Theremin, Guzheng
- Years active: 2002-present
- Website: www.yunyu.com.au

Yunyu(王韵毓) is an Australian musician, film composer and singer-songwriter originally from Singapore, now living in New South Wales.

She won Australia's Triple J Unearthed in 2002 with the song "You are Expendable", followed up with "A Prayer" a year later from her self-titled EP. Her music is mostly played on keyboards, pianoforte and synthesizers. Occasionally, when looking for variety, she will play the guzheng.

Yunyu is an alumna of the Australian Film Television and Radio School (AFTRS) with a Graduate Diploma of Screen Music, taught by Martin Armiger, Christopher Gordon and Kirke Godfrey.

Yunyu won the Crystal Pine award for Best Original Score | Short Film category at the 2015 International Samobor Film Music Festival for her work on a hybrid documentary, inspired by Ted Egan’s folk song "The Drover’s Boy".

She branched out to experiment with game and spatial music, after being introduced to virtual reality spaces by Michela Ledwidge from MOD Productions. This led to Yunyu modding the VR game Beat Saber, fusing wushu martial arts movements into the game of her own song composition, Pirates of the Silk Road, featuring guitars by Michael Sheridan, who she collaborated with from her last album, Twisted Tales. It was an exploration to see whether players can move and copy the choreographed wushu movements in time with the song, by hitting, slicing and avoiding blocks placed inside the game. This experience formed the basis of an academic paper she co-authored with Dr Rhett Loban, "The fight is the dance: modding Chinese martial arts and culture into Beat Saber".

In 2022, Yunyu was awarded a scholarship by Dolby Laboratories and Animal Logic Academy at The University of Technology, Sydney as a PhD candidate in Engineering and Information Technology, researching new composing methods and frameworks for music in mixed reality spatial audio environments, or Quest Driven Spatial Songs.

The following year, as part of her research, Yunyu and writer Michelle Mead wrote a multi-perspective sound narrative, called No One Died, which made its debut at the Ars Electronica Festival 2023 in Linz, Austria as part of a workshop for listeners to question accepted truths and discover how truths can be shaped and manipulated in story space.

Yunyu was commissioned by Australian taiko drumming ensemble Taikoz in early 2023 to compose a new piece for the Roland electronic taiko, TAIKO-1. The solo piece titled, “When The Rain God Sings, Storm Lions are Born” is performed by Ryuji Hamada and made its debut on 14 July 2023 as part of the Taikoz main stage program called Lion Dogs. The piece was performed again at SIGGRAPH Asia 2023 as part of Real Time Live!

The composition and its implementation was novel, turning the e-taiko in an electronic windchime where the player triggers sounds and loops not associated with a percussion instrument and beyond its original intent. The composition was recognised nationally with Yunyu being nominated as a finalist in the 2024 APRA AMCOS Art Music Awards for Work of the Year: Electroacoustic/Sound Art.

Yunyu has been invited to showcase her works in 2024 at The International Conference on New Interfaces for Musical Expression (NIME) and Gaudemaus Festival in Utrecht, Netherlands and Ars Electronica Festival in Linz, Austria, teaming up with visual artist Emma Smith and Taikoz player, Ryuji Hamada.

== Filmography ==
Yunyu is credited as music composer:

- Eternal Return (2014) directed by Vedrana Music
- Over The Hills And Far Away (2014) directed by Luke Marsden
- The Drover's Boy (2014) directed by Margaret McHugh
- Legacy (2014) directed by Josh Mawer

== Releases ==
2019

Twisted Tales Album of 12 songs - What happens when Fairytales come to live in our world? Each song is a Twisted Tale.

2012

Dorothy (Single) Reimagining of Dorothy from "The Wizard of Oz" inspired by the lost cosmonauts urban myth.

Butterflies (Single) Based on Chinese folk tale, "The Butterfly Lovers". Also featured on a transmedia collaboration with Kylie Chan’s "Small Shen" published by HarperCollins.

2011

Angel Arias (Single) Transmedia collaboration with Marianne de Pierres' "Burn Bright", commissioned by Random House Publishing.

2006

Spiked Soul

Her song "You are Expendable" topped the Canadian college Charts for a month peaking at No.6.

"Lenore’s Song" is a reply letter to Edgar Allan Poe’s "The Raven".

2004

Yunyu (EP)

== Music videos ==
The music video for Lenore's Song, produced in collaboration with director Tahnee McGuire and 'Lord of the Rings' cinematographer Callan Green and producer Matt Carter among others, was made of 16,000 digital pictures. It has been entered in competitions, winning a Gold Award and being a finalist in others.

- 2007 iPod Film Festival Finalist
- 2006 ACS NSW & ACT Award for Cinematography Gold Award
- 2006 ATOM Awards Finalist
- 2006 SunScreen Film Clip Festival Finalist
