= AniZona =

Annual anime convention in Arizona, U.S. (2005-2009)

- Status: Defunct
- Genre: Anime
- Frequency: Annually
- Venue: Embassy Suites Phoenix North (Phoenix, AZ); Marriott Mesa and Convention Center (Mesa, AZ)
- Country: United States
- Years active: 2005–2007; 2009
- Founders: Anthony Grutta, David Hungerford, Jason Bustard
- Attendance: 1,200 in 2006
- Major events: Cosplay, AMV contest
- Website: AniZona

AniZona was an annual anime convention based in Arizona that took place annually on Easter weekend (from Thursday to Sunday), hosted by AniZona Inc., a non-profit volunteer organization.

The inaugural convention, which was the first full-scale anime convention to be held in the state, occurred between March 25 and 27, 2005 at the Embassy Suites in Phoenix. The last convention was held in 2009.

== Events ==
Popular events included a cosplay contest, a karaoke contest, and an anime music video (AMV) contest. AniZona featured numerous programming items involving voice actors in the anime industry, generally from North America, as well as webcomic artists. The main Guest of Honor for the first convention was Yoshitaka Amano, and at least one Japanese guest, manga artist Haruka Miyabi, was confirmed by the convention for the third AniZona. Sponsors included distributors in the North American anime industry as well as local businesses in the Phoenix metropolitan area.

== History ==
The convention was founded by Anthony Grutta (who served as convention chair for the first year), David Hungerford, and Jason Bustard.

AniZona was the first convention dedicated to anime in the state. Although numerous small-scale anime and anime-related festivals had been held, there had not previously been any anime-specific conventions in Arizona.

After two years at the Embassy Suites Phoenix North, the third AniZona was held at the Phoenix Marriott Mesa and Convention Center in Mesa, Arizona, April 5–8, 2007. There was an attendance cap for the convention; pre-registration for AniZona 1 was capped at 800–850 attendees, although actual attendance was estimated to be higher due to a limited number of at-the-door registrations sold.

=== Event history ===
Dates	Location	Atten.	Guests
March 25–27, 2005	Embassy Suites Phoenix North; Phoenix, Arizona	850	Yoshitaka Amano, Katie Bair, Colleen Clinkenbeard, Aaron Dismuke, Nicole B. Gibson, Yaya Han, hide-san, Charles Dee Rice, and Travis Willingham.
April 14–16, 2006	Embassy Suites Phoenix North; Phoenix, Arizona	1,200	Katie Bair, David Beaty, Jodon Bellofatto, Colleen Clinkenbeard, Michael McConnohie, Melodee M. Spevack, Sonny Strait, and Greg Weisman.
April 5–8, 2007	Mesa Convention Center; Mesa, Arizona		Raymond Abril III, Greg Ayres, Katie Bair, David Beaty, Jodon Bellofatto, Michael McConnohie, Haruka Miyabi, Kenyth Mogan, Yoko Molotov, Melodee M. Spevack, and Amanda Tomasch.
March 21–23, 2008	Wigwam Resort; Litchfield Park, Arizona	CANCELLED	Richard Epcar, Chris Hazelton, Trish Ledoux, Natz, Ellyn Stern, Amanda Tomasch, Toybox, David Vincent, Toshifumi Yoshida
April 9–12, 2009	Embassy Suites Phoenix - Scottsdale; Phoenix, Arizona	1,000	Toybox.
