= Nadeshicon =

Japanese culture convention in Quebec City, Canada

- Status: Active
- Venue: Université Laval (2011-2018); Centre des congrès de Québec (2019-2026)
- Locations: Quebec City, Quebec
- Country: Canada
- Inaugurated: 2011
- Most recent: 2026
- Next event: 2027
- Attendance: 3000+ in 2025
- Organizer: Club Animé Québec (CAQ)
- Filing status: Non-profit
- Website: http://www.nadeshicon.ca/

Nadeshicon is a Japanese culture / anime convention held in April in Quebec City, Quebec, Canada at the Centre des congrès de Québec convention center since 2019, and initially at Université Laval (Laval University) in the Alphonse-Desjardins and Maurice-Pollack buildings from 2011 to 2018. The convention is run and organized by Club Animé Québec (CAQ), an extracurricular student association and nonprofit organization. It is recognized as one of the main Japanese cultural events in the city. Like most other anime conventions, Nadeshicon's events, attractions and activities include a Dealer's Room and an Artists Alley, anime screenings, panels and workshops, AMV contests, game shows, cosplay events (Masquerade, Fashion Show, etc.), and video games stations (Gaming Room). A part of the convention is also dedicated to cultural Japanese activities.

On August 18, 2023, the Administrative Council of Club Animé Québec has decided to cancel Nadeshicon's 2024 edition, citing severe understaffing for the convention's executive committee. It is not known when the next edition will be, but the anime club will continue to host smaller events and special activities for the fans. A scaled-down version of the convention in a smaller venue has been proposed, but this idea will be discussed and voted on by the new Administrative Council after their election in fall 2023.

== Programming ==
Like most other anime conventions, Nadeshicon's events, attractions and activities include a Dealer's Room and an Artists Alley, anime screenings, panels and workshops, AMV contests, game shows, cosplay events (Masquerade, Fashion Show, etc.), and video games stations (Gaming Room). A part of the convention is also dedicated to Japanese cultural activities.

- Art: a Dealer's Room and an Artists Alley
- Cosplay events: Masquerade, Fashion Show, etc.
- Gaming: Video games stations (Gaming Room)
- Merchandise:
- Music:
- Panels and workshops:
- Saturday Night Dance:
- Video screenings: Anime music video|AMV
- Other attractions:

== History ==
Nadeshicon had its beginnings with a single day celebrating Japanese culture in April 2009, which included a sushi dinner, a Japanese teacher sharing her experiences while living in Japan, and Calligraphy demonstrations. This event was held at the CAQ (Club Animé Québec) located at Université Laval and was followed the following year by the first Nadeshicon festival. In 2011, soon after CAQ became a non-profit organization, the festival was given its official name, Festival Nadeshicon, which mixes Popular Japanese Culture (ex: anime, masquerade) and Traditional Japanese culture (dance, martial arts, religion, cuisine, calligraphy, etc.).

In 2019, following continued growth in size, Nadeshicon moved to the larger Centre des congrès de Québec convention center near downtown, where it would share the venue with the city's comic book convention, the Quebec Comiccon.

=== Event history ===
Dates	Location	Attendance	Guests
April 9–10, 2011	Laval University; Quebec City, Quebec	660	Richard Fournier.
April 21–22, 2012	Laval University; Quebec City, Quebec	750	Richard Fournier, Maxime Chouinard, Fireflies, Léa Gabriele, Patricia Legrand, Hoshi*Furu, Pierre Nadeau, Ryoko Nakajima, Ryunosuke Yamazumi.
April 26–28, 2013	Laval University; Quebec City, Quebec	1,000+	Mel Gosselin, Tiffany Grant, Matt Greenfield, Komachi Montreal, Ryunosuke Yamazumi.
April 4–6, 2014	Laval University; Quebec City, Quebec	1400	MOON Kana, Orchestre de jeux vidéo, Christopher Macdonald, Geneviève "CelticSakura" La Haye, Marie-Claude Bourbonnais
April 17–19, 2015	Laval University; Quebec City, Quebec	1,832	Mika Kobayashi, MeltingMirror, WildRose, Puissance Maximale, Luduc, Komachi Montreal
April 1–3, 2016	Laval University; Quebec City, Quebec		Etienne Desilets-Trempe, Droo, Komachi Montreal, L'orchestre de Jeux Vidéo, Luduc, Miss Messy Mia, David Stephenson, Nienna Surion, Niq van der Aa, Ryunosuke Yamazumi
March 31-April 2, 2017	Laval University; Quebec City, Quebec		Marie-Claude Bourbonnais, Etienne Desilets-Trempe, Droo, Mel Gosselin, Komachi Montreal, Luduc, Nienna Surion, Ryunosuke Yamazumi
April 6–8, 2018	Laval University; Quebec City, Quebec		Arashi Daiko, Jean-François Bibeau, Marie-Claude Bourbonnais, Club de Shinkendo de Québec, Etienne Desilets-Trempe, Droo, Komachi Montreal, Luduc, Phil Mizuno, Benyamin Nuss, Arnie Roth, Ryunosuke Yamazumi
March 29–31, 2019	Centre des congrès de Québec; Quebec City, Quebec		Jean-François Bibeau, Club de Shinkendo de Québec, Droo, Aya Hirano, Komachi Montreal, Luduc, Twin Cosplay
