= Shuto Con =

Anime convention in Lansing, Michigan

Coordinates: 42°44′2″N 84°33′4″W

- Status: Defunct
- Genre: Anime, Manga
- Venue: Radisson Hotel Lansing at the Capitol
- Location: Lansing, Michigan
- Country: United States
- Inaugurated: 2011
- Most recent: 2019
- Attendance: 6,387 in 2017

Shuto Con was an annual three day anime convention held during March at the Radisson Hotel Lansing at the Capitol in Lansing, Michigan. The convention's name stands for Capital City Convention. The organizers have also hosted Random Battle Con, a video game convention.

== Programming ==
The convention typically offered an anime viewing room, artist alley, costume competition, dealers, gaming rooms, video game tournaments. Gaming ran 24-hours during the convention.

In 2011, the convention raised $2200 for 2011 Tōhoku earthquake and tsunami charities, and in 2012 supported the Greater Lansing Food Bank. 2018's charity ball benefited End Violent Encounters.

== History ==
Organizers of the first convention planned for 300 attendees, with 1,300 showing up. In 2012, the convention used all rooms in the Radisson Hotel. In both the first and second year, due to high attendance, the convention ran out of badges and lanyards. Shuto Con in 2014 had an attendance limit of 7,000 people. Gaming was relocated to the convention center in 2016. The convention fills all hotel rooms in the Radisson, along with several others as of 2017.

=== Event history ===
Dates	Location	Atten.	Guests
March 25-26, 2011	Lansing Convention Center; Lansing, Michigan	1,350	Tiffany Grant, Hobocon, Michelle Ruff, Doug Smith, Spike Spencer, The X-Hunters, and Year 200X.
March 16-18, 2012	Lansing Convention Center; Lansing, Michigan	2,475	Arc Impulse, Greg Ayres, The Enthusiasts, Richard Epcar, Fred Gallagher, Todd Haberkorn, Mary Elizabeth McGlynn, The Pillowcases, Doug Smith, The X-Hunters, and Year 200X.
April 5-7, 2013	Lansing Convention Center; Radisson Hotel Lansing; Lansing, Michigan	4,275	Arc Impulse, Armcannon, Greg Ayres, Colleen Clinkenbeard, DJ Freddy D., Knight of the Round, The Pillowcases, Chris Rager, Monica Rial, Tyson Rinehart, Chris Sabat, Sean Schemmel, Rikki Simons, Doug Smith, Sonny Strait, Sarah "Sully" Sullivan, Those Who Fight, DJ TKR, Tavisha Wolfgarth-Simons, and The X-Hunters.
April 4-6, 2014	Lansing Convention Center; Radisson Hotel Lansing; Lansing, Michigan		I Fight Dragons, DJ Jeffito, Knight of the Round, Jamie Marchi, Mary Elizabeth McGlynn, The Pillowcases, Professor Shyguy, Chris Rager, Monica Rial, Tyson Rinehart, Rikki Simons, Ian Sinclair, Sarah "Sully" Sullivan, theotoxin, and Tavisha Wolfgarth-Simons.
March 20-22, 2015	Lansing Convention Center; Radisson Hotel Lansing; Lansing, Michigan	6,000 (est.)	Jennifer Cihi, R. Bruce Elliott, Daniel Fredrick, E. Jason Liebrecht, Lydia Mackay, Jamie McGonnigal, Mega Ran, My Parents Favorite Music, Brina Palencia, Professor Shyguy, Monica Rial, Ian Sinclair, Super Guitar Bros., and J. Michael Tatum.
March 18-20, 2016	Lansing Convention Center; Radisson Hotel Lansing; Lansing, Michigan	6,240	2D6, Arc Impulse, Ariel, Zoey & Eli (AZE), Freezepop, Josh Grelle, Todd Haberkorn, Knight of the Round, Josh Martin, My Parents Favorite Music, The Pillowcases, Chris Rager, Monica Rial, Tyson Rinehart, Rikki Simons, Ian Sinclair, Super Guitar Bros., Tavisha Wolfgarth-Simons, and The World is Square.
March 17-19, 2017	Lansing Convention Center; Radisson Hotel Lansing; Lansing, Michigan	6,387	2D6, Arc Impulse, Linda Ballantyne, Bit Brigade, The Amazing BrandO, Brentalfloss, Christine Marie Cabanos, Carrie Keranen, Knight of the Round, Lauren Landa, Erica Mendez, Cassandra Lee Morris, Toby Proctor, Professor Shyguy, Monica Rial, Ian Sinclair, Super Guitar Bros., and Duane Zuwala.
March 23-25, 2018	Lansing Convention Center; Radisson Hotel Lansing; Lansing, Michigan		2D6, Sean Chiplock, SungWon Cho, Crayon Queen, Charles Dunbar, R. Bruce Elliott, Lauren Landa, Jason Marsden, Chris Patton, The Pillowcases, Professor Shyguy, Monica Rial, Tyson Rinehart, and Ian Sinclair.
March 22-24, 2019	Radisson Hotel Lansing at the Capitol; Lansing, Michigan		Caleb Hyles and Thomas Mckee.
