= AzeCON =

Anime convention in Azerbaijan

- Mascot of the convention, "Ayna"
- Status: Active
- Genre: Anime convention
- Frequency: Annual
- Country: Azerbaijan
- Inaugurated: 20 June 2014
- Most recent: AzeCON: Magicians Unite!, 6 October 2019

Azerbaijani Anime Convention, (Azerbaijani: Azərbaycan Anime Konvensiyası), or simply AzeCON, was an annual anime convention held in Azerbaijan. It was the first and only anime convention in Azerbaijan. The main goal of the convention was to bring together all of the anime, manga/comics and modern Japanese culture fans in Azerbaijan. There were six AzeCONs held since its debut.

The convention was intended to be held twice a year, in summer and winter, but at the end, it became annual. Anime conventional entertainments included: karaoke, just dance, treasure hunting, stage show, Japanese anime café, video games, animanga-themed stands, cosplay competition, and photo sessions. A cosplay contest was held in two nominations, individual and team. The mascot of the convention was a female anime character called "Ayna".

== Conventions held ==
Name	Date	Location	Ref.
AzeCON 1	20 June 2014	Qafqaz Baku City Hotel	
AzeCON 2	8 February 2015	Baku Jazz Center	
AzeCON 3	23 August 2015	ITC Plaza (Atrium Hall)	
AzeCON 4	7 August 2016	ITC Plaza (Atrium Hall)	
AzeCON: Pirates of the Caspian	16 April 2017	Holiday Inn Baku	
AzeCON: The Galactic Journey	15 April 2018	Holiday Inn Baku	
AzeCON: Magicians Unite!	6 October 2019	Baku Sports Palace	
AzeCON 8	19 April 2020		
