= Animaritime =

Canadian anime and gaming convention

- Status: Active
- Genre: Anime; Gaming
- Venue: Fredericton Convention Centre
- Locations: Fredericton, New Brunswick
- Country: Canada
- Inaugurated: 2004
- Attendance: 1,826 in 2015
- Organizer: Mount Allison University Anime Club (founder); Society for Atlantic Fan Cultures (current)
- Website: https://www.animaritime.info/

Animaritime is an anime and gaming convention founded by members of the Mount Allison University anime club.

The convention was first held as an anime-only convention on the university campus in Sackville, New Brunswick in 2004. It was the first anime con to be held in the Canadian Maritimes. 2010 festivities consisted of two smaller conventions called Animinitime, each a one-day con, located in Halifax, Nova Scotia and Moncton, New Brunswick. Animaritime moved to Fredericton, New Brunswick for the 2013 convention.

== History ==
=== Event history ===
Dates	Location	Attendance	Guests
March 19–21, 2004	Mount Allison University; Sackville, New Brunswick	35	Cheri, André Richard, and Lindsay Searles
February 25–27, 2005	Mount Allison University; Sackville, New Brunswick	104	Martin Bastarache, Deborah Hale, and André Richard
February 24–26, 2006	Mount Allison University; Sackville, New Brunswick	238	Martin Bastarache, Patrick Delahanty, Deborah Hale, and André Richard
February 23–25, 2007	Ramada Plaza Crystal Palace Hotel; Dieppe, New Brunswick	544	K. V. Johansen and André Richard
March 7–9, 2008	The Delta Beauséjour; Moncton, New Brunswick	825	Svetlana Chmakova, K. V. Johansen, Jones, and Nicole Letersky
March 6–8, 2009	The Delta Beauséjour; Moncton, New Brunswick	1,000 (est)	
April 25, 2010 (Animinitime)	Westin Nova Scotian; Halifax, Nova Scotia	500	Faith Erin Hicks
July 17, 2010 (Animinitime)	The Delta Beauséjour; Moncton, New Brunswick	500	Faith Erin Hicks
July 1–3, 2011	The Delta Beauséjour; Moncton, New Brunswick	1,268	Ed Chavez, Faith Erin Hicks, and Spike Spencer
June 29 – July 1, 2012	The Delta Beauséjour; Moncton, New Brunswick	1,313	Chris Cason and Faith Erin Hicks
June 28–30, 2013	Fredericton Convention Centre; Fredericton, New Brunswick	1,702	Ed Chavez, Kumar Sivasubramanian, and Brad Swaile
June 27–29, 2014	Fredericton Convention Centre; Fredericton, New Brunswick	1,725	Kyle Hebert, Vance Vegas Salvalaggio, and Allisa Swanson
June 26–28, 2015	Fredericton Convention Centre; Fredericton, New Brunswick	1,826	Jennifer Cihi, Stefanie DeLeo, Nathan DeLuca, Brenda Hickey, and Pixielocks
July 1–3, 2016	Fredericton Convention Centre; Fredericton, New Brunswick	1,959	Nathan DeLuca
June 30 – July 2, 2017	Fredericton Convention Centre; Fredericton, New Brunswick	1,638	Brian Beacock, Jennifer Cihi, and Stefanie DeLeo
June 29 – July 1, 2018	Fredericton Convention Centre; Fredericton, New Brunswick	1,780	Nathan DeLuca, Lauren Landa, John Stocker
June 28–30, 2019	Fredericton Convention Centre; Crowne Plaza Fredericton-Lord Beaverbrook; Fredericton, New Brunswick		
June 23–25, 2023	Fredericton Convention Centre; Crowne Plaza Fredericton-Lord Beaverbrook; Fredericton, New Brunswick		
June 28–30, 2024	Fredericton Convention Centre; Crowne Plaza Fredericton-Lord Beaverbrook; Fredericton, New Brunswick		Brian Beacock, Alexander Cogswell, DeviCat, HarFam Cosplay, and Sol Ring MTG
July 4–6, 2025	Fredericton Convention Centre; Crowne Plaza Fredericton-Lord Beaverbrook; Fredericton, New Brunswick		
