= Con-Nichiwa =

Annual anime convention held in Tucson, Arizona

Coordinates: 32°12′54″N 110°54′26″W

- Status: Active
- Genre: Anime, Japanese culture
- Venue: DoubleTree by Hilton Hotel Tucson – Reid Park
- Location: Tucson, Arizona
- Country: United States
- Inaugurated: 2010
- Attendance: 2,232
- Organizer: Saboten Con, Monkey Paw Entertainment, Tucson Anime Screening Society (T.A.S.S.), and AZHP
- Website: http://www.con-nichiwa.com

Con-Nichiwa is an annual anime convention held during November at the DoubleTree by Hilton Hotel Tucson – Reid Park in Tucson, Arizona.

== Programming ==
The convention typically offers a cosplay cafe, cosplay parade, J-Fashion show, maid cafe, masquerade, panels, and vendors.

== History ==
The convention moved from the Holiday Inn Palo Verde to the Tucson Convention Center in 2014 due to growth. Con-Nichiwa shared the Tucson Convention Center with Bernie Sanders and Donald Trump 2016 election campaign events. Con-Nichiwa 2020 was moved from June to November due to the COVID-19 pandemic, but was later cancelled.

=== Event history ===
Dates	Location	Atten.	Guests
March 26–28, 2010	Holiday Inn Hotel & Suites Tucson Airport North; Tucson, Arizona		Katie Bair, Brit Frady-Wiliams, Crispin Freeman, Kitsune Robot, Jamie Marchi, Vic Mignogna, J. Michael Tatum, and Toybox.
March 25–27, 2011	Holiday Inn Palo Verde; Tucson, Arizona		91.8 The Fan, Jillian Coglan, Samurai Dan Coglan, Todd Haberkorn, Steve "Warky" Nunez, Estevan Olivas, and Sonny Strait.
March 23–25, 2012	Holiday Inn Palo Verde; Tucson, Arizona		Colleen Clinkenbeard, Richard Epcar, Kyle Hebert, Mike McFarland, Steve "Warky" Nunez, Monica Rial, and Sean Schemmel.
March 22–24, 2013	Holiday Inn Palo Verde; Tucson, Arizona		Greg Ayres, Steve Blum, Wendee Lee, Maridah, Li Kovacs, and Raj Ramayya.
March 21–23, 2014	Tucson Convention Center; Tucson, Arizona	2,132	Richard Epcar, Catherine Jones, Cherami Leigh, Bryce Papenbrook, Ellyn Stern, Candy Bomber, and Nylon Pink.
March 20–22, 2015	Tucson Convention Center; Tucson, Arizona	2,232	Akabane Vulgars On Strong Bypass, Electric Lady, Li Kovacs, Harrison Krix, Cara Nicole, James Perry II, Stephanie Sheh, The Slants, Alfred Trujillo, Cristina Vee, Armand Villavert Jr., and David Vincent.
March 18–20, 2016	Tucson Convention Center; Tucson, Arizona		Mr. Creepy Pasta, Enayla, Mel Hoppe, E. Jason Liebrecht, Elizabeth Maxwell, Chris Patton, Armand Villavert Jr., and Kari Wahlgren.
March 24–26, 2017	Tucson Convention Center; Tucson, Arizona		Dustbunny, Brittney Karbowski, Vic Mignogna, and Chii Sakurabi.
April 20–22, 2018	Tucson Convention Center; Tucson, Arizona	2,198	Zach Callison, Leah Clark, Sandy Fox, Alfred Trujillo, VickyBunnyAngel, and Elise Zhang.
June 21–23, 2019	JW Marriott Tucson Starr Pass Resort & Spa; Tucson, Arizona		Carrie Keranen, Faye Mata, Mike McFarland, The Slants, Armand Villavert Jr., and Vitamin H Productions.
November 19-21, 2021	DoubleTree by Hilton Hotel Tucson - Reid Park; Tucson, Arizona		Chris Hackney, Kyle "Turtle Smithy" Mathis, Malinda "Malindachan" Mathis, Xander Mobus, and Armand Villavert Jr.
November 18-20, 2022	DoubleTree by Hilton Hotel Tucson - Reid Park; Tucson, Arizona		Feodor Chin, Jackie Lastra, Alan Lee, Armand Villavert Jr., and Vitamin H Productions.
November 3-5, 2023	DoubleTree by Hilton Hotel Tucson - Reid Park; Tucson, Arizona		Allegra Clark, Brittany Lauda, Pros and Cons Cosplay, Matt Shipman, Armand Villavert Jr., and Vitamin H Productions.
November 22-24, 2024	DoubleTree by Hilton Hotel Tucson - Reid Park; Tucson, Arizona		Dani Chambers, Cynthia Cranz, Richard Epcar, Brian Mathis, Ellyn Stern, John Swasey, and Vitamin H Productions.
November 21-23, 2025	DoubleTree by Hilton Hotel Tucson - Reid Park; Tucson, Arizona		Charlet Chung, Dorothy Fahn, Tom Fahn, Christina Marie Kelly, and Vitamin H Productions.
October 30 - November 1, 2026	DoubleTree by Hilton Hotel Tucson - Reid Park; Tucson, Arizona		Drew Breedlove and Ricco Fajardo.
