= Quo Vadis 2 =

1997 video game

QuoVadis 2: Wakusei Kyoushuu Orphan Rei
- Developer(s): Glams
- Publisher(s): Glams
- Series: Quo Vadis
- Platform(s): Sega Saturn
- Release: JP: April 4, 1997
- Genre(s): Real-time tactics, real-time strategy
- Mode(s): Single-player, multiplayer

Quo Vadis 2 is a video game developed and published by Glams for the Sega Saturn.

== Gameplay ==
Quo Vadis 2 is a squad-level real-time game featuring customizable mechs.

== Reception ==
Next Generation reviewed the Saturn version of the game, rating it four stars out of five, and stated that "Glams may not have created the next big game, but Western designers should watch their backs when it turns its attention to Quo Vadis 3."
