= Shinboku-con =

Anime convention in Huron, Ohio

Coordinates: 41°24′33″N 82°35′43″W

- Status: Defunct
- Genre: Anime, Role-playing
- Venue: Sawmill Creek Resort
- Location: Huron, Ohio
- Country: United States
- Inaugurated: 2007
- Most recent: 2014
- Attendance: 743 in 2013
- Organizer: LCCC Anime Society & Roleplayer's Association

Shinboku-con was an annual four-day anime convention held during April at the Sawmill Creek Resort in Huron, Ohio.

== Programming ==
The convention typically offers anime showings, cosplay contest, dances, panels, professional wrestling, trading card tournaments, vendors/artist room, and video game tournaments.

== History ==
Shinboku-con was founded in 2007 by members of the Lorain County Community College Anime Society and Roleplayer's Association. In 2010 the convention became a three-day event, and had its first industry guest, Tiffany Grant. In 2011 three attendees were arrested at the convention, two men were involved in a dispute over the playing of a video game which resulted in a punch to the mouth and an officer being spit on. Another man was arrested for an incident involving the damage of hotel property and underage consumption of alcohol. The convention expanded to a partial fourth day in 2014. Shinboku-con cancelled their 2015 event.

=== Event history ===
Dates	Location	Atten.	Guests
April 29, 2007	Lorain County Community College; Elyria, Ohio	247	
April 20, 2008	Lorain County Community College; Elyria, Ohio	467	Ultra Ball
April 18, 2009	Lorain Southview High School; Lorain, Ohio	457	Gavin Goszka and Stephen A. Poon.
April 16–18, 2010	Holiday Inn Cleveland-Elyria/Lorain; Elyria, Ohio	656	Gavin Goszka, Tiffany Grant, and Niji.
April 29-May 1, 2011	Holiday Inn Cleveland - West (Westlake); Westlake, Ohio	698	Gavin Goszka, Kyle Hebert, and Niji.
April 27–29, 2012	Elyria Ramada Inn; Elyria, Ohio	703	Eric Burton, FM, Kyle Hebert, and Team Con-Docs.
April 12–14, 2013	Ramada Elyria; Elyria, Ohio	743	Eric Burton, Gavin Goszka, Kyle Hebert, and Alexis Tipton.
April 10-13, 2014	Sawmill Creek Resort; Huron, Ohio		Abracadabra Productions, Robert Axelrod, Eric Burton, Chris Cason, Amber Lee Connors, Charles Dunbar, Kyle Hebert, Andrew Hilton, Larina, Danielle McRae, Alexis Tipton, and Uncle Yo.
