= Hamacon =

Anime convention in Huntsville, Alabama

Coordinates: 34°43′37″N 86°35′27″W

- Status: Defunct
- Genre: Anime, Gaming
- Venue: Von Braun Center
- Location: Huntsville, Alabama
- Country: United States
- Inaugurated: 2010
- Most recent: 2019
- Attendance: 3,300 in 2018

Hamacon (Huntsville and Madison Anime Convention) was an annual three-day anime convention held during July at the Von Braun Center in Huntsville, Alabama. The convention was founded by Michelle Timon.

== Programming ==
The convention typically offered an cosplay contest, dance-party, dealers room, demonstrations, formal ball, game library, inflatables zone, model building, nerf gun wars, video game tournaments, and workshops.

The convention in 2013 had a Red Cross blood drive and held raffles with the money raised also being donated. Another blood drive would be held during the 2018 convention. Hamacon as of 2018 was bringing an estimated $2 million annually to the city.

== History ==
Additional gaming space was added for 2017. Gaming space was increased by double for the 2018 convention. The convention almost had parking issues for the 2019 event, but was able to work with the city to secure spots. Hamacon's 2019 event would be its last.

=== Event history ===
Dates	Location	Atten.	Guests
June 4-6, 2010	Holiday Inn Huntsville Downtown; Huntsville, Alabama	About 350	Aleathia Burns, Tiffany Grant, Aaron Pabon, Micah Solusod, Carolann Voltarel, and William Ward.
June 3-5, 2011	Holiday Inn Huntsville Downtown; Huntsville, Alabama		Chris Cason, Jo Envel, DJ Inubito, Brina Palencia, Seraphina, Micah Solusod, and Toybox.
June 1-3, 2012	Von Braun Center; Huntsville, Alabama		91.8 The Fan, Ed Chavez, Jo Envel, Todd Haberkorn, DJ Inubito, SkyBlew, Micah Soluso, Jessica Straus, and Greg Wicker.
May 31 - June 2, 2013	Von Braun Center; Huntsville, Alabama		91.8 The Fan, Caitlin Glass, Clarissa Graffeo, Carl Gustav Horn, Laugh Out Loud, Gerald Rathkolb, Micah Solusod, Daryl Surat, and Greg Wicker.
June 6-8, 2014	Von Braun Center; Huntsville, Alabama	2,750	DJ Inubito, Mega Ran, Jad Saxton, Ian Sinclair, Micah Solusod, DJ Tony T, and DJ Wes.
June 26-28, 2015	Von Braun Center; Huntsville, Alabama		DM Ashura, Leah Clark, Junko Fujiyama, Kyle Hebert, DJ Inubito, Gerald Rathkolb, Micah Solusod, Daryl Surat, Vitamin H Productions, Greg Wicker, and Apphia Yu (Ayu Sakata).
June 17-19, 2016	Von Braun Center; Huntsville, Alabama		Ed Chavez, Aaron Dismuke, Junko Fujiyama, Alain Mendez, Erica Mendez, Vitamin H Productions, and Sarah Anne Williams.
June 23-25, 2017	Von Braun Center; Huntsville, Alabama		Aaron Dismuke, Caleb Hyles, Neil Nadelman, Emily Schmidt, Micah Solusod, Alexis Tipton, and Apphia Yu (Ayu Sakata).
June 22-24, 2018	Von Braun Center; Huntsville, Alabama	3,300	501st Legion, Mr. Creepy Pasta, Junko Fujiyama, Erika Harlacher, Marin M. Miller, Third Impact Anime, Austin Tindle, and Greg Wicker.
July 19-21, 2019	Von Braun Center; Huntsville, Alabama		Mr. Creepy Pasta, Junko Fujiyama, Tiffany Grant, Chuck Huber, Micah Solusod, Third Impact Anime, and Apphia Yu (Ayu Sakata).

== Hamacon Minicon ==
Hamacon Minicon was a one-day anime convention held during November at the Von Braun Center in Huntsville, Alabama. The convention's programming included anime viewings, a game shows, gaming tournaments, panels, vendors, and video game tournaments. A Red Cross blood drive was also held in 2012.

=== Event history ===
Dates	Location	Atten.	Guests
November 13, 2010	Bevill Conference Center and Hotel; Huntsville, Alabama		
November 12, 2011	Von Braun Center; Huntsville, Alabama		DJ Inubito and Seraphina.
November 10, 2012	Von Braun Center; Huntsville, Alabama		DJ Inubito, Andy Price, and DJ Tony T.
November 9, 2013	Von Braun Center; Huntsville, Alabama		DJ Inubito, DJ Tony T, and DJ Wes.
November 15, 2014	Von Braun Center; Huntsville, Alabama	Approximately 1,000	DJ Inubito
November 14, 2015	Von Braun Center; Huntsville, Alabama		
November 12, 2016	Von Braun Center; Huntsville, Alabama		
November 11, 2017	Von Braun Center; Huntsville, Alabama		
November 10, 2018	Von Braun Center; Huntsville, Alabama		

== See also ==
- Kami-Con
