= Lone Star Expo Center =

Multi-purpose arena in Conroe, Texas

Coordinates: 30.350361°N 95.429928°W

The Lone Star Expo Center is a 5,000-seat multi-purpose arena in Conroe, Texas, USA. It hosts local sporting events, concerts, and other events. It was opened in 2001. In 2007, it became home to the now-defunct Conroe Storm indoor football team.

The arena is part of the Lone Star Convention Center, which opened in 2000. The two locations were supposed to open together, but the arena was delayed due to construction issues.
