= No Brand Con =

Anime convention

Coordinates: 44°48′42.2″N 91°29′57.2″W

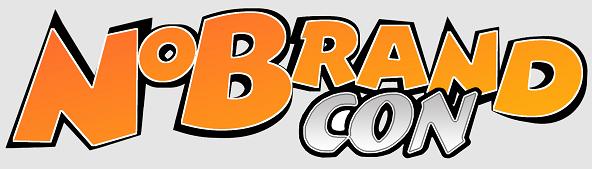
- Status: Active
- Venue: The Lismore Hotel Eau Claire
- Location: Eau Claire, Wisconsin
- Country: United States
- Inaugurated: 2002
- Attendance: 1,504 in 2015
- Website: http://www.nobrandcon.org/

No Brand Con is an annual three-day anime convention held in May at The Lismore Hotel Eau Claire in Eau Claire, Wisconsin. The convention was founded by members of the University of Wisconsin–Eau Claire Anime Appreciation Society. The name "No Brand Con" was inspired by the closing credits theme of the anime Here Is Greenwood.

== Programming ==
No Brand Con features anime viewings, an anime music video contest, artist alley, board games, comics, a dealers' room, independent films, panels, role playing, video games tournaments, and voice actor appearances.

== History ==
In 2005, the convention moved to the Plaza Hotel and Suites, which allowed for food sales and enabled the convention to run for a full 24 hours. From 2006 to 2010, the convention was held at the Ramada Inn Convention Center, before returning to the Plaza Hotel and Suites for 2011. In 2011, the convention generated around $277,000 for the economy of Eau Claire, and held a benefit for the Japanese Red Cross. In 2016, the event relocated from Eau Claire to the Chula Vista Resort in Wisconsin Dells, WI. No Brand Con 2020 was moved from April to August due to the COVID-19 pandemic, but was later cancelled. No Brand Con 2021 was also cancelled due to the COVID-19 pandemic.

=== Event history ===
Dates	Location	Atten.	Guests
April 5–6, 2002	UW-Eau Claire Davies Center; Eau Claire, Wisconsin	115	Tiffany Grant and Steve Kurth.
April 4–6, 2003	UW-Eau Claire Davies Center; Eau Claire, Wisconsin	250	Tiffany Grant, Brazil Joe Grisaffi, Steve Kurth, and Doug Smith.
March 12–14, 2004	UW-Eau Claire Davies Center; Eau Claire, Wisconsin	300	Rob Giffen, Brazil Joe Grisaffi, and Monica Rial.
April 15–17, 2005	Plaza Hotel and Suites; Eau Claire, Wisconsin	400	Greg Ayres, Mike McFarland, Chris Patton, and Monica Rial.
April 21–23, 2006	Ramada Inn Convention Center; Eau Claire, Wisconsin	605	Tiffany Grant, Matt Greenfield, Brazil Joe Grisaffi, and Kyle Hebert.
April 20–22, 2007	Ramada Inn Convention Center; Eau Claire, Wisconsin	905	Lisa Furukawa, Tiffany Grant, Brazil Joe Grisaffi, Kyle Hebert, and Spike Spencer.
April 18–20, 2008	Ramada Inn Convention Center; Eau Claire, Wisconsin	1,075	Johnny Yong Bosch, Kyle Hebert, R. K. Milholland, The Slants, and Sonny Strait.
April 24–26, 2009	Ramada Inn Convention Center; Eau Claire, Wisconsin	1,249	Robert Axelrod, Tiffany Grant, Jason Griffith, Steam Century (HMA Badger), Kevin "Vinnk" Tambornino, and Michael "Mookie" Terracciano.
April 30-May 2, 2010	Ramada Inn Convention Center; Eau Claire, Wisconsin		Chris Cason, Dr. Cancer and the SKAmbies, Todd Haberkorn, Wendy Powell, and Michael "Mookie" Terracciano.
April 15–17, 2011	Plaza Hotel and Suites; Eau Claire, Wisconsin	1,271	Jay Bauman, brentalfloss, Colleen Clinkenbeard, Monica Rial, Chris Seward, Mike Stoklasa, and Matthew Taranto.
May 4–6, 2012	Plaza Hotel and Suites; Eau Claire, Wisconsin		Jason "Liquid86" Bruner, Chris Cason, Jillian Coglan, Samurai Dan Coglan, Quinton Flynn, Kyle Hebert, Mega Ran, K-Murdock, and Andre "DJ Jinrei" Smith.
April 12–14, 2013	Plaza Hotel and Suites; Eau Claire, Wisconsin		DJ Amaya, Leah Clark, Jillian Coglan, Samurai Dan Coglan, Richard Horvitz, Jamie Marchi, The Protomen, Andre "DJ Jinrei" Smith, and Kent Williams.
April 25–27, 2014	Plaza Hotel and Suites; Eau Claire, Wisconsin		Jason "Liquid86" Bruner, Jillian Coglan, Samurai Dan Coglan, Darrel Guilbeau, Andre "DJ Jinrei" Smith, Eric Stuart, and Katie Tiedrich.
April 24–26, 2015	Plaza Hotel and Suites; Eau Claire, Wisconsin	1,504	Tia Ballard, Jason "Liquid86" Bruner, Jillian Coglan, Samurai Dan Coglan, Kyle Hebert, Andre "DJ Jinrei" Smith, and Matthew Taranto.
April 15–17, 2016	Chula Vista Resort; Wisconsin Dells, Wisconsin		DJ Amaya, Jillian Coglan, Samurai Dan Coglan, Mr. Creepy Pasta, Tiffany Grant, Briana Lawrence, Ryan Reynolds, Andre "DJ Jinrei" Smith, and Jessica Walsh.
April 21–23, 2017	Chula Vista Resort; Wisconsin Dells, Wisconsin		Jillian Coglan, Samurai Dan Coglan, Mr. Creepy Pasta, John Gremillion, Kyle Hebert, Katie Tiedrich, and Uncle Yo.
May 4–6, 2018	Chula Vista Resort; Wisconsin Dells, Wisconsin		SungWon Cho, Jillian Coglan, Samurai Dan Coglan, Kid Yuki and the Otakus, Micah Solusod, and John Swasey.
March 29–31, 2019	Chula Vista Resort; Wisconsin Dells, Wisconsin		Mr. Creepy Pasta, Lewis Lovhaug, Kyle McCarley, and Xander Mobus.
April 22-24, 2022	Chula Vista Resort; Wisconsin Dells, Wisconsin		Chris Hackney, Lewis Lovhaug, and Sarah Wiedenheft.
September 1-3, 2023	Holiday Inn Stevens Point - Convention Ctr; Stevens Point, Wisconsin		Chris Guerrero, Christina Marie Kelly, Lewis Lovhaug, and Wig-Wig Cosplay.
May 1-3, 2026	The Lismore Hotel Eau Claire; Eau Claire, Wisconsin		Lewis Lovhaug
