= Shoujocon =

Anime and manga convention in the United States

- Status: Defunct
- Location: New Jersey/New York
- Country: United States
- Inaugurated: 2000
- Most recent: 2003
- Attendance: 600 in 2003
- Organizer: Shoujo Arts Society

Shoujocon was an American fan convention for anime and manga which focused on the shōjo (girls') subgenre. The convention was founded in 2000 by then-anonymous women identified as "Nora" and "Katchan", and initially financed through eBay sales of fan-donated merchandise. Shoujocon quickly grew from 456 attendees to a peak of 1,252. In addition to its unique audience, Shoujocon attempted many other organizational and programmatic innovations during its time, such as an international staff which held meetings entirely online, support for doujinshi artists and writers, and cultural workshops.

In 2002, Nora and Katchan stepped down, turning leadership over to the newly formed Shoujo Arts Society (SAS), a non-profit organization incorporated to manage Shoujocon and promote the shōjo subgenre via other events. For the 2003 convention, Shoujocon moved to Rye, New York, where difficulties with the hotel and the change of location triggered a severe drop in attendance and poor reviews of the convention. The 2004 convention was first postponed, then canceled altogether.

Working with the organizers of Yuricon, the Shoujo Arts Society later announced a joint event called "Onna!" which was held in October 2005.

== History ==
=== Event history ===
Dates	Location	Atten.	Guests
July 15–16, 2000	Newark Gateway Hilton; Newark, New Jersey	456	Roxanne Beck, Mandy Bonhomme
July 14–15, 2001	East Brunswick Hilton; East Brunswick, New Jersey	1,252	Katsumi Kurata, Ryo Hitaka, Mandy Bonhomme, Colleen Doran
July 19–21, 2002	East Brunswick Hilton; East Brunswick, New Jersey	1,229	Mandy Bonhomme, Friends of Lulu, Azusa Kurokawa, Jamie McGonnigal, Liam O'Brien, and Umbrella Studios.
August 22–24, 2003	Rye Town Hilton; Rye Brook, New York	600	Katie Bair, Kelli Shayne Butler, Tiffany Grant, and Jamie McGonnigal.
