= SaikouCon =

American cartoon convention

Coordinates: 41°04′22.2″N 75°42′40.2″W

- Status: Defunct
- Genre: Anime, Manga, Japanese culture
- Venue: Mountain Laurel Resort
- Location: White Haven, Pennsylvania
- Country: United States
- Inaugurated: 2013
- Attendance: 2,800 in 2019
- Organizer: Michael Meade
- Website: https://www.saikoucon.com

SaikouCon was an annual three-day anime convention held every August at the Mountain Laurel Resort in White Haven, Pennsylvania. The convention's name, which translates to "best convention" in Japanese, reflected its ambition to provide a premier anime experience. Notably, SaikouCon was the first anime convention to be hosted in the Lehigh Valley.

== Programming ==
The convention typically offered a dance party, costume contest, concerts, a merchant's hall, tabletop games, video games, and workshops. The 2014 charity auction benefited the Dave Thomas Foundation and St. Jude's Children's Research Hospital.

== History ==
SaikouCon was located at the Holiday Inn Conference Center Lehigh Valley in Breinigsville in 2013 and 2014. In 2015, the convention moved to the Best Western Lehigh Valley Hotel Conference Center. SaikouCon then moved from the Split Rock Resort in Lake Harmony back to Allentown in 2017, taking place at the Holiday Inn Center City. The 2018 convention was held at the Econo Lodge Conference Center in Allentown. Due to the COVID-19 pandemic, SaikouCon was postponed in 2020. SaikouCon 2021 was cancelled due to a lack of programming and operational problems, leading to the convention's closure.

=== Event History ===
Dates	Location	Atten.	Guests
August 23–25, 2013	Holiday Inn Conference Center Lehigh Valley; Breinigsville, Pennsylvania	850	Joshua Adams, The D20 Girls Project, Terri Doty, Darrel Guilbeau, Hitomi Himekawa, Greg Houser, League of Hot Geeks, Uke Li, Jessie Pridemore, Bill Rogers, Jad Saxton, Sci-Fi Photo Guys, The Slants, DJ Soul Eater, and Marc Swint.
August 22–24, 2014	Holiday Inn Conference Center Lehigh Valley; Breinigsville, Pennsylvania	1,500	The Adarna, The Asterplace, Cosplay Burlesque, Greg Houser, League of Hot Geeks, Jessie Pridemore, Bill Rogers, Sci-Fi Photo Guys, Sonny Strait, and Marc Swint.
August 28–30, 2015	Best Western Lehigh Valley Hotel Conference Center; Bethlehem, Pennsylvania	3,000	The Adarna, Leah Clark, Cosplay Burlesque, Hazel Dayze, Koralene, Danielle McRae, Jessie Pridemore, Sci-Fi Photo Guys, and Adam WarRock.
August 26–28, 2016	Split Rock Resort; Lake Harmony, Pennsylvania	2,850	The Adarna, Dino Andrade, Robert Axelrod, Celsius, Cloudsofsand, Cosplay Burlesque, Deprived, Foxxy, Darrel Guilbeau, Koralene, Jessie Pridemore, REAKT, Sci-Fi Photo Guys, Take Away The Ugly, and Kari Wahlgren.
August 18–20, 2017	Holiday Inn Allentown Center City; Allentown, Pennsylvania		The Adarna, Leah Clark, Deprived, Gigi Edgley, R. Bruce Elliott, Foxxy, The Gothic Celt, Greg Houser, Koralene, The Manly Battleships, REAKT, and Oscar Seung.
July 27–29, 2018	Econo Lodge Conference Center; Allentown, Pennsylvania		8BIT Ambitions, The Adarna, Dolly Love, Gigi Edgley, Foxxy, Kohei Hattori, Christina Marie Kelly, Koralene, REAKT, Stellure, TiA, and Lex Winter.
August 2–4, 2019	Mountain Laurel Resort; White Haven, Pennsylvania	2,800	8BIT Ambitions, Cosplay Burlesque, Dolly Love, Foxxy, Greg Houser, The Manly Battleships, Pine State Heroes, and WildSpice.
