= Samantha Inoue-Harte =

American voice actress

- Born: April 21, 1979 (age 47); Virginia, United States
- Other names: Sami Harte; Sammy Harte
- Occupations: voice actress, animation instructor
- Employer(s): ADV Films; FUNimation Entertainment

Samantha Inoue Harte (born April 21, 1979) is an American voice actress and founder of an animation studio called Saiko Studios. She is perhaps most recognized for her role as the Chocobo in Final Fantasy: Unlimited, the anime series, and as Kohran Li in Sakura Wars.

== Career ==
=== Animated works ===
- A Scanner Darkly
- Birth – Munga
- Blade of the Phantom Master – Bat
- Clerks: The Lost Scene
- Cosplay Complex – Delmo
- Devil Lady – Flame Monster and Remi
- Fairy Tail – Kemo–Kemo (Eps. 223–224)
- Final Fantasy: Unlimited – Chobi the Chocobo, Crux, Cactuar
- Gatchaman – Devil Star #2, Additional Voices (ADV dub)
- Happy Lesson – Alice
- Lilo & Stitch 2: Stitch Has A Glitch
- Magical Witchland – Pipin
- Negima! – Tsukuyomi
- Pumpkin Scissors – Dieter, Additional Voices
- Sakura Wars – Li Kohran
- SpikeTV's Fresh Baked Video Games
- Soul Hunter – Shinyoh
- Steam Detectives – Cat
- Trinity Blood – Carly
- Wedding Peach – Fortune Faye

=== Live-action ===
- Teeth (uncredited gore FX artist)
- Grindhouse
- Sin City
- Jesse's Closet
- No Pain, No Gain
- Homo Erectus
- Idiocracy
- Elvis & Annabelle
- Kabluey
- Man of the House
- A Scanner Darkly
- Office Space

=== Video games ===
- DC Universe Online – Isis
