= Jan Scott-Frazier =

American film producer (1965–2024)

Jan Scott-Frazier (born Scott Frazier, March 22, 1965 – December 3, 2024) was an American animator and translator who worked in various roles in the Japanese anime industry for 20 years, including producer. Frazier was one of the few foreigners to work in the Japanese anime industry. Jan Scott Frazier died on December 3rd, 2024. She was 59 years old.

== Life and career ==
Frazier moved to Japan in April 1987 and switched to an animation education program that October. She eventually taught at the school in December 1988. Frazier was in Hangzhou, China when the Tiananmen Square protests of 1989 escalated. During her drive to the airport, she was briefly shot at. During Frazier's career, she worked in many roles including animation checker, photographer and inbetweener. Starting in 1992, Frazier set up TAO, a studio in Thailand and ran it for 4 1/2 years. Riots also occurred in Bangkok when Frazier worked there. Izumi Matsumoto in 1994 created the first digital manga, named Comic On, with Frazier producing.

Frazier worked for Production I.G as a technical director and would serve as president of the Japan-based studio's United States branch in 1996. She would later leave the company to become a freelancer. During Blood: The Last Vampire's production, Frazier's unedited first draft of the English language dialog was unexpectedly used. Frazier would also work on several video games including Ghost in the Shell and Quo Vadis 2. She returned to the United States due to a Japanese anime industry collapse and worked for a company that wanted help in the US. During the Anime Central 2001 costume contest, Frazier served as minister during artist Robert DeJesus' wedding. Frazier would later start the nonprofit Voices For, a group of voice actors who released the album Voices for Peace and donated the money to charities including CARE and Doctors Without Borders.

In January 2022, voice actress Amanda Winn-Lee launched a crowdfunding campaign to help fix or replace Frazier's oxygen concentrator. Lee said Frazier was in poor health and had recently been removed from a kidney transplant list. On August 23, 2024, Frazier launched a crowdfunding campaign to help her get into a assisted living facility. On October 31, 2024, Scott-Frazier launched another crowdfunding campaign to pay for living assisted costs due to a robbery.

Scott-Frazier died on December 3, 2024, at the age of 59.

== Buchigiri Part 4 ==
Discussed during several interviews, the worst anime Frazier worked on was Buchigiri 4 for Artland, and she asked to not be credited. Due to constraints (speed and low budget), several cost-cutting measures were used, including outsourcing of cel work to Korea and reduced cel counts. Due to Buchigiri being so despised by staff, the storyboards were later burned at 3 a.m. in a Red Lobster parking lot.
