= Belly of the Beast =

Belly of the Beast or In the Belly of the Beast may refer to:

== Literature ==
- In the Belly of the Beast, a 1981 book by Jack Abbott
- In the Belly of the Beast, a 1989 comic book in the Terminator series
- The Belly of the Beast, issue #1 (published in 1992) of the comic book series Mouse Guard
- Belly of De Beast, a 1996 album by poet-writer Benjamin Zephaniah
- Belly of the Beast, a 1997 issue of the comic book series Sam & Max
- "In the Belly of the Beast", a 1999 short story by William King (author)
- "In the Belly of the Beast", a 2006 chapter of the manga Fullmetal Alchemist
- Mythos Tales #1: Belly of the Beast, a 2011 book in the Savage Worlds series

== Film ==
- Belly of the Beast (2003 film), an action film starring Steven Seagal
- The Belly of the Beast, 2008, written by and starring Lucius Baston and Jim Fitzpatrick
- In the Belly of the Beast, a documentary about filmmaking, covering the production of several films including A Gun for Jennifer
- Belly of the Beast (2020 film), a documentary by Erika Cohn

== Theatre ==
- In the Belly of the Beast, 1983–1985 stage performances based on the book by Jack Henry Abbott, starring William Petersen
- In the Belly of the Beast Revisited, a 2004 play based on the book by Jack Henry Abbott, performed by the 29th Street Rep

== Television ==
- "Belly of the Beast", a 1991 episode of the private detective television series Gabriel's Fire with an appearance by Dayton Callie
- "Belly of the Beast", a 1993 episode of the television sitcom Coach
- "In the Belly of the Beast", a 1994 episode of the animated television series BattleTech: The Animated Series
- "Belly of the Beast", a 1994 episode of the CGI television series ReBoot
- "Belly of the Beast", a 1995 episode of the animated children's television series Littlest Pet Shop (1995 TV series)
- "Belly of the Beast", a 1997 episode of the teen comedy-drama television series Breaker High
- "Belly of the Beast", a 2002 episode of the science fiction television series Andromeda
- "Belly of the Beast", a 2006 episode of the animated television series Super Robot Monkey Team Hyperforce Go!
- "Belly of the Beast", a 2009 episode of the children's television series Power Rangers
- "Belly of the Beast", a 2011 episode of the animated television series Adventure Time (season 2)
- "The Belly of the Beast", a 2011 episode of the animated comedy television series Phineas and Ferb
- "Belly of the Beast", a 2013 episode of the reality television competition series Ultimate Survival Alaska
- "Belly of the Beast", a 2013 episode of the reality cable television series Dual Survival
- "In the Belly of the Beast", a 2014 episode of the comedy-drama police procedural television series Castle
- "The Belly of the Beast", a 2014 episode of the reality television series Small Town Security
- "Belly of the Beast", a 2016 episode of the action television series NCIS: Los Angeles (season 8)
- "Belly of the Beast", a 2017 episode of the television drama series Wentworth (season 5)
- "Belly of the Beast", a 2017 episode of the horror drama television series The Strain
- "Belly of the Beast", a 2017 episode of the period drama television series Turn: Washington's Spies
- "Belly of the Beast", a 2017 episode of the animated web television series Skylanders Academy
- "Belly of the Beast", a 2017 episode of the comic science fiction video web series Red vs. Blue
- "Belly of the Beast", a 2024 episode of the legal drama television series Matlock

== Music ==
- "Belly of the Beast", a song on the 1991 album #66064 by Lifers Group
- "Belly of the Beast", a song by Anthrax on the 1991 album Persistence of Time
- The Belly of the Beasts – Live '91 & '92, an album by Beasts of Bourbon
- "Belly of the Beast (Back in Babylon)", a song by Cabaret Voltaire on the 1993 International Language (album)
- "Belly of the Beast", a song by Tigertailz on the 1995 album Wazbones
- "Belly of the Beast", a song by hip hop artists Sway & King Tech and DJ Revolution on the 1999 album This or That
- "Belly of the Beast", a song by Danzig on the 1999 album 6:66 Satan's Child
- "The Belly of the Beast", a song by Eightball and Big Duke on the 1999 Thicker than Water (soundtrack)
- Belly of the Beast, a 2006 album by Saigon (rapper)
- "Belly of the Beast", a song by The Plastic Constellations on the 2006 Crusades (album)
- "Belly of the beast", a song by Lords of the Underground album on the 2007 House of Lords (Lords of the Underground album)
- The Return, Part 2: Belly of the Beast, a 2007 album produced by Prophet Entertainment
- "Belly of the Beast", a song by the hip hop group Onyx on the 2012 album CUZO
- "Belly of the Beast", a song by the hip-hop group Quakers on the 2012 Quakers (album)
- "Belly of the Beast", a song by Neil Davidge on the 2012 Halo 4 Original Soundtrack
- "Belly of the Beast", a song on the soundtrack of the 2013 fantasy adventure film Percy Jackson: Sea of Monsters
- "Belly of the Beast", a song by Gazelle Twin on the 2014 album Unflesh
- "Belly of the Beast", a song on the 2014 album Electric Velvet by 3-11 Porter
- "Belly of the Beast", a song by Joey Badass on the 2015 album B4.Da.$$
- "Belly of the Beast", a song by The Libertines on the 2015 album Anthems for Doomed Youth
- "Belly of the Beast", a song on the 2016 album Mellow Diamond by Janel Leppin
- "Belly of the Beast", a song by Bernard Fanning on the 2016 album Civil Dusk
- "Belly of the Beast", a song by Sixx:A.M. on the 2016 album Prayers for the Damned
- "Belly of the Beast", a song composed by James Spanos on the soundtrack of the 2016 action platform video game Until I Have You
- Belly of the Beast, a 2017 album by hip hop artist Citizen Kay
- "Belly of the Beast", a song by Diamond Head on the 2019 album The Coffin Train

== Other ==
- In the Belly of the Beast (Atlas Games), a 2002 role-playing game adventure published by Atlas Games
- "Belly of the Beast", a 2014 downloadable mission episode in the video game Sniper Elite III
- Belly of the Beast (restaurant), a Mexican restaurant in Spring, Texas, US

== See also ==
- "Belly of the Beat", a song by Grimes on the 2015 album Art Angels
- "The Belly and the Beast", a song by folk singer Anais Mitchell on the 2004 album Hymns for the Exiled
