= SNAFU Con =

Anime convention in Reno, Nevada, U.S.

Coordinates: 39.486°N 119.791°W

- Status: Defunct
- Genre: Anime, Manga, Gaming
- Venue: Reno-Sparks Convention Center
- Location: Reno, Nevada
- Country: United States
- Inaugurated: 2010; 16 years ago
- Most recent: 2026
- Attendance: 2,187 in 2019
- Organizer: Science LLC
- Website: https://snafucon.com/

SNAFU Con was an annual three day anime convention held during October at the Reno-Sparks Convention Center in Reno, Nevada. SNAFU was an abbreviation for Sierra Nevada Anime Fans Unite. The event was created by the Anime and Manga Society of UNR, under the name Shadows.

== Programming ==
The convention typically offered an artist alley, contests, cosplay meetups, gaming (arcade, computer, console, tabletop), gaming tournaments, karaoke, masquerade, rave, swap meet, vendor's room, and workshops. SNAFU Con had 24 hour a day programming during the convention. They also held a free "day zero" event. The Humane Society benefited from 2015's charity auction. 2017's charity auction benefited the Big Brothers Big Sisters of Northern Nevada. The charity auction in 2025 benefited the Special Needs Community of Northern Nevada.

== History ==
In 2014, the Grand Sierra Resort's lower floor housed the convention. The convention in 2015 moved to the Nugget Casino Resort, due to space change issues at the Grand Sierra. Criticism about the 2015 masquerade was due to the long judging deliberations. The convention moved back to the Grand Sierra Resort in 2018. SNAFU Con 2020 was cancelled due to the COVID-19 pandemic. In 2024, the convention moved to the Reno-Sparks Convention Center. The 2026 event was the last SNAFU Con.

=== Event history ===
Dates	Location	Atten.	Guests
October 22–23, 2010	Grand Sierra Resort; Reno, Nevada	691	Robert Axelrod, Jessica Douglas, Etaru, Lynn Hardy, Jess Hartley, Mel Hoppe, Yayoi Neko, Steve "Warky" Nunez, and Robert Wiese.
September 9–11, 2011	Grand Sierra Resort; Reno, Nevada	1,025	Matt Cole, Preston Cowley, Christopher Escalante, Quinton Flynn, Darrel Guilbeau, Lynn Hardy, Dr Hikaru, Mel Hoppe, Steve "Warky" Nunez, Paper Hearts Cosplay, Robert Wiese, and Lisle Wilkerson.
September 28–30, 2012	Grand Sierra Resort; Reno, Nevada	1,283	Yamila Abraham, Brad Beachell, Preston Cowley, Christopher Escalante, Steve "Warky" Nunez, Wendy Pini, and Sonny Strait.
October 25–27, 2013	Grand Sierra Resort; Reno, Nevada	1,623	Preston Cowley, Tanglwyst De Holloway, Christopher Escalante, Matthew Fazio, Tiffany Grant, Mel Hoppe, Chuck Huber, Steve "Warky" Nunez, and Jan Scott-Frazier.
October 24–26, 2014	Grand Sierra Resort; Reno, Nevada	1,902	Marissa Ames, Chris Cason, Preston Cowley, Christopher Escalante, Paul Esquer, Daryl Frazetti PhD, Mel Hoppe, Michaela Laws, Ashley Montgomery, Steve "Warky" Nunez, Mark Oshiro, Laura Post, and The Slants.
October 30 – November 1, 2015	John Ascuaga's Nugget Casino Resort; Sparks, Nevada		Marissa Ames, Preston Cowley, Christopher Escalante, Daryl Frazetti PhD, Robbie Lunt, Danielle McRae, Steve "Warky" Nunez, Team Seven Cosplay, Kiba Walker, Elwin G. Williams III.
October 7–9, 2016	John Ascuaga's Nugget Casino Resort; Sparks, Nevada		Preston Cowley, Christopher Escalante, Mel Hoppe, Danielle McRae, Steve "Warky" Nunez, Aaron Roberts, and Kiba Walker.
October 6–8, 2017	Nugget Casino Resort; Sparks, Nevada		DaRapNerd, Daydreamernessa, G.S. Denning, Christopher Escalante, Dorothy Fahn, Kevin Frane, Daryl Frazetti PhD, Mel Hoppe, Lady Staba, Danielle McRae, Steve "Warky" Nunez, Paul St. Peter, Spencer Stoner, and Kiba Walker.
November 16–18, 2018	Grand Sierra Resort and Casino; Reno, Nevada		DaRapNerd, Christopher Escalante, Paul Esquer, Mel Hoppe, Danielle McRae, Daman Mills, Ashley Montgomery, Steve "Warky" Nunez, and Steve Prince.
November 15–17, 2019	Grand Sierra Resort and Casino; Reno, Nevada	2,187	DaRapNerd, Paul Esquer, Cole Feuchter, Marissa Lenti, Melissa McCommon, Danielle McRae, Ashley Montgomery, Aaron Romo, Spencer Stoner, Bill Timoney, and Kiba Walker.
October 29–31, 2021	Grand Sierra Resort and Casino; Reno, Nevada		DaRapNerd, Cole Feuchter, John Gremillion, Danielle McRae, Steve "Warky" Nunez, Aaron Romo, and Lisle Wilkerson.
November 17–19, 2023	Grand Sierra Resort and Casino; Reno, Nevada		DaRapNerd, Bonnie Gordon, and Steve "Warky" Nunez.
November 1–3, 2024	Reno-Sparks Convention Center; Reno, Nevada		Christopher Escalante, Kayleigh McKee, Danielle McRae, Steve "Warky" Nunez, Spencer Stoner, and Stuart Zagnit.
October 31 – November 2, 2025	Reno-Sparks Convention Center; Reno, Nevada		Christopher Escalante, Kevin Frane, Steve "Warky" Nunez, Spencer Stoner, Laura K. Welsh, Gavin Black, Shane Tay, Steven Yu, Jade Griffin, and Angel Rose.
October 9-11, 2026	Reno-Sparks Convention Center; Reno, Nevada		Christopher Escalante, Steve "Warky" Nunez, Spencer Stoner, Astro, Gavin Black, Jade Griffin, GumiV4, Kay Kennedy, Kenny Loui, Shane Tay, Steven Yu.
