= Nan Desu Kan =

Anime convention in Aurora, Colorado

Coordinates: 39°44′31″N 104°59′22″W

- Status: Active
- Genre: Anime
- Venue: Gaylord Rockies Resort & Convention Center
- Location: Aurora, Colorado
- Country: United States
- Inaugurated: 1997
- Attendance: 18,987 in 2017
- Organizer: Rocky Mountain Anime Association
- Filing status: 501(c)(4)
- Website: http://www.ndkdenver.org/

Nan Desu Kan (NDK) is an annual three-day anime convention held during August/September at the Gaylord Rockies Resort & Convention Center in Aurora, Colorado. The convention is the largest anime convention in the Rocky Mountain region and each one takes eighteen months to plan. Its name in Japanese roughly means nan desu ka (何ですか), "what is it?". The parent company, Rocky Mountain Anime Association, is a registered 501(c)(4) nonprofit organization.

== Programming ==
The convention typically offers an anime music video contest, art showings and auctions, cultural panels, dances, dealer's room, games, masquerade, musical guests, screenings of anime, and workshops. NDK at one time hosted a contest for attendees who decorate their atrium hotel rooms, with the winners receiving a free hotel room. The convention has held various fundraisers since 2000 to support organizations that include: American Diabetes Association, American Red Cross, Child's Play, Japan America Society of Colorado, Susan G. Komen Foundation, and the United Way Gulf Recovery Fund (2010). In 2012, $12,000 was raised for the Aurora Victim Relief Fund and other charities. The 2015 charity fundraiser was a poker tournament for Dumb Friends League. The conventions tabletop and video gaming room runs 24 hours during the event.

== History ==
Prior to 2000 the convention was known as Nan Desu Kon. Renovations in the hotel were still underway prior to the start in 2003, but did not affect the convention. The convention chose not to move to the Colorado Convention Center due to attendee logistic issues (hotels, money, and parking). The convention instituted an attendance cap of 7,500 per day in 2011 due to event quality and attendee comfort concerns. The attendance cap of 7,500 per day continued into 2012 and the convention was a sellout. The convention added the Hilton Garden Inn DTC hotel in 2013, occurred during the 2013 Colorado floods, and attendance remained capped at 7,500 attendees. Along with the flooding the fire alarm went off, tornado warnings occurred, long lines occurred, and the masquerade had to be stopped due to a medical emergency. The convention also hosted the World Cosplay Summit Mountain Qualifiers with Green Jello Cosplay winning.

Nan Desu Kan moved from the Marriott Denver Tech Center to Sheraton Denver Downtown Hotel in 2015 due to growth and included an expanded dealers room. Nan Desu Kan 2020 was cancelled due to the COVID-19 pandemic. In 2021, the convention moved to the Gaylord Rockies Resort & Convention Center.

=== Event history ===
Dates	Location	Atten.	Guests
August 30, 1997	Tivoli Student Union; Denver, Colorado	153	Rich Arnold, Steve Bennett, and Jan Scott-Frazier.
July 17–19, 1998	Stapleton Plaza Hotel; Denver, Colorado	575	Steve Bennett, Kuni Kimura, and Jan Scott-Frazier.
September 24–26, 1999	Sheraton Denver West; Lakewood, Colorado	935	Tiffany Grant and Jan Scott-Frazier.
October 13–15, 2000	Sheraton Denver West; Lakewood, Colorado	1,477	Hiroshi Aro, Kevin Bennett, Steve Bennett, Juliet Cesario, Matt Greenfield, Hiroki Hayashi, Carl Gustav Horn, Scott Houle, Mari Iijima, Taliesin Jaffe, Shin Kurokawa, Lanelle Markgraf, Panther Comics, Jan Scott-Frazier, Scott Simpson, and Pamela Weidner.
September 21–23, 2001	Holiday Inn Denver International Airport; Denver, Colorado	1,711	Steve Bennett, Bob Bergen, Keith Burgess, Newton Ewell, Cynthia Hands, Taliesin Jaffe, Toshihiro Kawamoto, Tristan MacAvery, Scott McNeil, Panther Comics, Deb Rabbai, Jan Scott-Frazier, Nobuyuki Takahashi.
September 20–22, 2002	Holiday Inn Denver International Airport; Denver, Colorado	2,467	Steve Bennett, Bob Bergen, Keith Burgess, Rodney "Largo" Caston, Emily DeJesus, Robert DeJesus, Newton Ewell, Crispin Freeman, Cynthia Hands, Mari Iijima, Taliesin Jaffe, Wendee Lee, Tristan MacAvery, Scott McNeil, Nobuyuki Ohnishi, Estevan Olivas, Jonathan Osborne, Panther Comics, Deb Rabbai, Susumu Sakurai, Jan Scott-Frazier, Nobuyuki Takahashi, Shawn the Touched, Greg Wicker, Toshifumi Yoshida, and Yume No Senshi.
September 19–21, 2003	Holiday Inn Denver International Airport; Denver, Colorado	2,802	Gil Asakawa, Bob Bergen, Emily DeJesus, Robert DeJesus, Newton Ewell, Tiffany Grant, Matt Greenfield, Cynthia Hands, Kyle Hebert, Carol Jacobanis, Toshihiro Kawamoto, Vic Mignogna, Panther Comics, Chris Patton, Jan Scott-Frazier, Michael Sinterniklaas, Brett Weaver, and Greg Wicker.
September 17–19, 2004	Holiday Inn Denver International Airport; Denver, Colorado	3,059	Akina, Alexandra Carter, Michael Coleman, Emily DeJesus, Robert DeJesus, Brian Dobson, Michael Dobson, Paul Dobson, Kumiko Kato, Heather Martin, Jason Martin, Panther Comics, Susumu Sakurai, and Jan Scott-Frazier.
September 16–18, 2005	Marriott Denver Tech Center; Denver, Colorado	4,532	Emily DeJesus, Trevor Devall, Trish Ledoux, Heather Martin, Jason Martin, Hiromi Matsushita, Sean McCoy, Panther Comics, Deb Rabbai, Monica Rial, Carrie Savage, Jan Scott-Frazier, Doug Smith, Brad Swaile, Kazuko Tadano, and Toshifumi Yoshida.
October 6–8, 2006	Marriott Denver Tech Center; Denver, Colorado	5,218	Steve Bennett, Keith Burgess, Emily DeJesus, Robert DeJesus, Michael Dobson, Lisa Furukawa, Michael Gluck, Darrel Guilbeau, Kyle Hebert, Heather Martin, Jason Martin, Masao Maruyama, Seiji Mizushima, Panther Comics, Yuzo Sato, Sean Schemmel, Jan Scott-Frazier, Doug Smith, Spike Spencer, and Takahiro Umehara.
September 14–16, 2007	Marriott Denver Tech Center; Denver, Colorado	5,218	Greg Ayres, Steve Bennett, Emily DeJesus, Robert DeJesus, Richard Epcar, Lisa Furukawa, Heather Martin, Jason Martin, Panther Comics, Wendy Powell, Jan Scott-Frazier, Michael Sorich, Spike Spencer, Ellyn Stern, and Brett Weaver.
September 12–14, 2008	Marriott Denver Tech Center; Denver, Colorado	6,125	Steve Bennett, Robert DeJesus, Kara Edwards, Caitlin Glass, Noriko Hidaka, Heather Martin, Jason Martin, Vic Mignogna, Yuji Mitsuya, Chris Patton, Wendy Powell, Monica Rial, Jan Scott-Frazier, The Slants, Steve Yun, and Tommy Yune.
September 11–13, 2009	Marriott Denver Tech Center; Denver, Colorado	7,000	Aaron Dismuke, Todd Haberkorn, Kyle Hebert, Heather Martin, Jason Martin, Rica Matsumoto, Michael McConnohie, Miki Nagasawa, Chris Patton, Michael Powell, Wendy Powell, Jan Scott-Frazier, Melodee M. Spevack, Cristina Vee, Steve Yun, and Tommy Yune.
September 10–12, 2010	Marriott Denver Tech Center; Denver, Colorado	7,200	Chris Cason, Richard Ian Cox, echostream, Rebecca Forstadt, Jerry Jewell, Kazha, Heather Martin, Kevin McKeever, Chris Patton, Wendy Powell, Patrick Seitz, Cristina Vee, Steve Yun, and Tommy Yune.
September 9–11, 2011	Marriott Denver Tech Center; Denver, Colorado		Chris Cason, Leah Clark, Todd Haberkorn, Clarine Harp, Lemon Drop Kick, Jamie Marchi, Heather Martin, Mary Elizabeth McGlynn, Kevin McKeever, Vic Mignogna, Ryuusei Nakao, Tony Oliver, Patrick Seitz, Stephanie Sheh, Michael Sinterniklaas, Yutaka Yamamoto, Steve Yun, and Tommy Yune.
September 14–16, 2012	Marriott Denver Tech Center; Denver, Colorado	7,500	Chris Cason, Leah Clark, Cynthia Cranz, Clarine Harp, Chuck Huber, Charlene Ingram, Osamu Kobayashi, Lauren Landa, Lolita Dark, Heather Martin, Jason Martin, Masao Maruyama, Kevin McKeever, Randy Milholland, Brina Palencia, Wendy Powell, Jan Scott-Frazier, Patrick Seitz, John Sirabella, Sarah "Sully" Sullivan, J. Michael Tatum, and Steve Yun.
September 13–15, 2013	Marriott Denver Tech Center; Denver, Colorado		Tia Ballard, Leah Clark, Kara Edwards, Todd Haberkorn, Clarine Harp, Taliesin Jaffe, Lauren Landa, Cherami Leigh, Lotus Juice, Heather Martin, Kevin McKeever, Bryce Papenbrook, Chris Patton, Raj Ramayya, Justin Rojas, Patrick Seitz, David Vincent, Steve Yun, Tommy Yune, Hidenori Matsubara, Tyson Rinehart, and Jan Scott-Frazier.
September 12-14, 2014	Marriott Denver Tech Center; Denver, Colorado		Takahiko Abiru, Chris Cason, Ian Condry, Robbie Daymond, Alisa Freedman, Clarine Harp, Hiroyuki Hashimoto, Chuck Huber, Kazha, Lauren Landa, Heather Martin, Jason Martin, Mary Elizabeth McGlynn, Kevin McKeever, Chris Patton, Wendy Powell, Rachel Robinson, Jan Scott-Frazier, Patrick Seitz, Sonny Strait, David Vincent, Steve Yun, and Tommy Yune.
September 4-6, 2015	Sheraton Denver Downtown Hotel; Denver, Colorado		Robbie Daymond, Alisa Freedman, Toshio Furukawa, Clarine Harp, Taliesin Jaffe, Carrie Keranen, Jonathan Klein, Lauren Landa, Heather Martin, Jason Martin, Mike McFarland, Kevin McKeever, Scott McNeil, Randy Milholland, Lisa Ortiz, Jan Scott-Frazier, J. Michael Tatum, Alexis Tipton, and Steve Yun.
September 2-4, 2016	Sheraton Denver Downtown Hotel; Denver, Colorado		Chris Bevins, Johnny Yong Bosch, Richard Epcar, Eyeshine, Alisa Freedman, Jessie James Grelle, Clarine Harp, Roland Kelts, Lauren Landa, Carl Martin, David Matranga, Kevin McKeever, Chris Patton, Wendy Powell, Rachel Robinson, Tara Sands, Dai Sato, Jan Scott-Frazier, Patrick Seitz, Ellyn Stern, Sonny Strait, Teca, Alexis Tipton, Shinichiro Watanabe, Steve Yun, and Tommy Yune.
September 1-3, 2017	Sheraton Denver Downtown Hotel; Denver, Colorado	18,987	Dante Basco, Leah Clark, Clarine Harp, Kyle Hebert, Erik Scott Kimerer, Lauren Landa, Jason Marsden, Kevin McKeever, Ryuusei Nakao, Sumi Shimamoto, Ian Sinclair, Steve Yun, and Tommy Yune.
August 31 - September 2, 2018	Sheraton Denver Downtown Hotel; Denver, Colorado		Zach Aguilar, Sandy Fox, Keiko Han, Megumi Han, Clarine Harp, Samantha Inoue-Harte, Lauren Landa, Lex Lang, Cherami Leigh, Heather Martin, Elizabeth Maxwell, Chris Patton, Patrick Seitz, and Teca.
August 23-25, 2019	Sheraton Denver Downtown Hotel; Denver, Colorado		Dante Basco, Ray Chase, Leah Clark, Robbie Daymond, Jerry Jewell, Brittney Karbowski, Kazha, Heather Martin, Erica Mendez, Max Mittelman, Pannon, Jad Saxton, and Teca.
September 3-5, 2021	Gaylord Rockies Resort & Convention Center; Aurora, Colorado		Major Attaway, Amelie Belcher, Dani Chambers, Alisa Freedman, Billy Kametz, Heather Martin, Jason Martin, Kevin McKeever, Daman Mills, Madeleine Morris, Wendy Powell, John Swasey, Teca, and Kent Williams.
September 2-4, 2022	Gaylord Rockies Resort & Convention Center; Aurora, Colorado		Major Attaway, Amelie Belcher, Johnny Yong Bosch, Anthony Bowling, Jessica Cavanagh, Jim Foronda, Alisa Freedman, Kyo Cosplay, Lauren Landa, Leviathan Cosplays, Heather Martin, Jason Martin, Kevin McKeever, Wendy Powell, Pros and Cons Cosplay, John Swasey, Olivia Swasey, Teca, and Barry Yandell.
September 1-3, 2023	Gaylord Rockies Resort & Convention Center; Aurora, Colorado		Bryn Apprill, Amelie Belcher, Johnny Yong Bosch, Cole Feuchter, Wendee Lee, Emi Lo, Heather Martin, Jason Martin, Lisa Ortiz, Wendy Powell, Team Whatever Cosplay, Kiba Walker, and Wingedlight Cosplay.
August 30 - September 1, 2024	Gaylord Rockies Resort & Convention Center; Aurora, Colorado		Jessica Cavanagh, R. Bruce Elliott, Cole Feuchter, Alisa Freedman, Kikuko Inoue, Macy Anne Johnson, Marissa Lenti, Heather Martin, Risa Mei, Pannon, Wendy Powell, Oscar Seung, Kiba Walker, Howard Wang, and December Wynn.
August 29-31, 2025	Gaylord Rockies Resort & Convention Center; Aurora, Colorado		Lisette Monique Diaz, Alisa Freedman, Amanda Gish, Barbara Goodson, Jason Martin, Brian Mathis, Marcus M. Mauldin, Wendy Powell, Kent Williams, and Barry Yandell.
September 4-6, 2026	Gaylord Rockies Resort & Convention Center; Aurora, Colorado		Morgan Berry, Bill Butts, Dani Chambers, Alisa Freedman, Krystal LaPorte, Heather Martin, Jason Martin, Bryan Massey, Wendy Powell, Aaron Roberts, Diana "Binkx" Tolin, December Wynn, and Barry Yandell.

== Other events ==
On August 8, 2004 the convention held a CosPlay Dance Party at the Rock Island Night Club in Denver, Colorado. In 2011, Nan Desu Kan organized a benefit for the Japanese Red Cross named Rave2Save. The event was held on Saturday April 30, 2011 at the Marriott Denver Tech Center, which donated the Evergreen Ballroom, and funds raised at the event were matched by the Rocky Mountain Anime Association. The event raised $13,440.
