= Anime Banzai =

Anime convention in Layton, Utah, United States

Coordinates: 41°05′03.7″N 111°58′50.2″W

- Status: Defunct
- Genre: Anime, Manga, Video games, culture
- Venue: Davis Conference Center
- Location: Layton, Utah
- Country: United States
- Inaugurated: 2005
- Most recent: 2024
- Organizer: Utah Anime Promotions
- Website: http://www.animebanzai.org/

Anime Banzai was an annual three-day anime convention held during October at the Davis Conference Center in Layton, Utah. The name of the convention roughly comes from the Japanese word for "hooray". The convention is organized by Utah Anime Promotions and was run by a volunteer staff.

== Programming ==
The convention typically featured an AMV contest, arcade gaming, artist alley, board gaming, card gaming, cosplay contest, formal dance, karaoke, panel discussions, special guests, video games, vendors, and workshops.

== History ==
Anime Banzai was founded by the Salt Lake Community College "End of the World" Japanese Animation Club in 2004. Over 600 people attended the first year, while the organizers were expecting less than 300 attendees. The convention was held at the Salt Lake Community College in the Student Center for two years, the Sheraton City Centre Hotel for three, until moving to the Davis Conference Center due to the convention's growth. The convention in 2010 brought $400,000 to the economy and signed a three-year contract with the Davis Conference Center. In 2011, the convention brought an estimated $350,000+ to the economy. The 2012 convention brought $491,000 to the economy and remained at the Davis Conference Center. The convention in 2013 signed an agreement to return to the Davis Conference Center until 2015.

Representatives of Anime Banzai in 2012, while commenting on articles discussing why Salt Lake City did not have a large comic con, have stated that the convention would like to (and most likely will) return to Salt Lake City. Problems include outgrowing most convention space in the area, outgrowing the Davis Conference Center, affordability of the Salt Palace, and they hoped a new venue will be built that can handle conventions like Anime Banzai. Anime Banzai 2020 was cancelled due to the COVID-19 pandemic. Anime Banzai 2024 was cancelled in early August 2024 due to numerous internal issues, but would in September change into a goodbye event.

=== Event history ===
Dates	Location	Atten.	Guests
October 15, 2005	Salt Lake Community College; Salt Lake City, Utah	600	
October 20–21, 2006	Salt Lake Community College; Salt Lake City, Utah		Ichidan, Ken Rand, Amy Reeder, and Spike Spencer.
August 31–September 1, 2007	Sheraton City Centre Hotel; Salt Lake City, Utah		Artbeat, Michael Dobson, Ichidan, and Steve "Warky" Nunez.
October 24–25, 2008	Sheraton City Centre Hotel; Salt Lake City, Utah		Tiffany Grant, Ichidan, Vic Mignogna, Steve "Warky" Nunez, and Sonny Strait.
October 16–18, 2009	Sheraton City Centre Hotel; Salt Lake City, Utah	3,000 (est)	Chuck Huber, Ichidan, Steve "Warky" Nunez, Michelle Ruff, and XDCosplayDX.
October 8–10, 2010	Davis Conference Center; Layton, Utah	3,200	Michael Coleman, Newton Ewell, Lynn Hardy, Ichidan, Steve "Warky" Nunez, Sonny Strait, and The Slants.
October 21–23, 2011	Davis Conference Center; Layton, Utah	3,500 (est)	Tonya Adolfson, Brad Beachell, Matt Cole, COO-Interactive Entertainment, Preston Cowley, Christopher Escalante, Chuck Huber, April Nunez, Steve "Warky" Nunez, Wendy Pini, Jan Scott-Frazier, and Lisle Wilkerson.
October 19–21, 2012	Davis Conference Center; Layton, Utah	4,146	L.B. Bryant, Steve "Warky" Nunez, Chris Patton, Amanda Rush, Micah Solusod, and David Vincent.
October 18–20, 2013	Davis Conference Center; Layton, Utah		Richard Ian Cox, Darrel Guilbeau, Kyle Hebert, Jamie McGonnigal, Christopher Robin Miller, Steve "Warky" Nunez, and Laura Post.
October 17–19, 2014	Davis Conference Center; Layton, Utah		Chuck Huber, Vic Mignogna, Steve "Warky" Nunez, Chris Patton, Jan Scott-Frazier, and Sonny Strait.
October 16–18, 2015	Davis Conference Center; Layton, Utah		Tanglwyst De Holloway, Michelle Ann Dunphy, Christopher Escalante, Bill Galvan, Danielle McRae, Steve "Warky" Nunez, Laura Post, and David Vincent.
October 21–23, 2016	Davis Conference Center; Layton, Utah		Chris Cason, Kara Edwards, Julie Rei Goldstein, Steve "Warky" Nunez, Steff Von Schweetz, and Kiba Walker.
October 20-22, 2017	Davis Conference Center; Layton, Utah		Sean Chiplock, Michaela Laws, Jamie McGonnigal, Daman Mills, Steve "Warky" Nunez, Pannon, and Diana Tolin.
October 19-21, 2018	Davis Conference Center; Layton, Utah		Ben Dunn, Cole Feuchter, Natalie Rose Hoover, Steve "Warky" Nunez, Pannon, David Vincent, and Kiba Walker.
October 18-20, 2019	Davis Conference Center; Layton, Utah		AlpacaAsh, Jennifer Cihi, Stefanie DeLeo, Ben Dunn, Newton Ewell, Trina Nishimura, Steve "Warky" Nunez, Pannon, Derek Stephen Prince, Jez Roth, Alejandro Saab, Tara Sands, and Bryan Young.
October 15-17, 2021	Davis Conference Center; Layton, Utah		Ray Chase, Robbie Daymond, Bonnie Gordon, Max Mittelman, Steve "Warky" Nunez, Jez Roth, and Samantha Sawyer.
October 14-16, 2022	Davis Conference Center; Layton, Utah		Aki Glancy, Bonnie Gordon, Johnny N' Junkers, Adam McArthur, Landon McDonald, Steve "Warky" Nunez, Matthew David Rudd, Samantha Sawyer, Kaiji Tang, Anne Yatco, and Bryan Young.
October 20-22, 2023	Davis Conference Center; Layton, Utah		Aaron Campbell, Mary Claypool, Les E. Claypool III, Keith R. A. DeCandido, Bonnie Gordon, Marissa Lenti, Ry McKeand, Steve "Warky" Nunez, Wendy Pini, Jez Roth, Samantha Sawyer, and Bryan Young.
October 18-20, 2024	Davis Conference Center; Layton, Utah		Steve "Warky" Nunez, Christopher Escalante, Shane Tay, Sean Tay, DaPaPaJJ, and Steven Crowe.
