= Voices of the Lifestream =

Soundtrack album by OverClocked ReMix
- Released: September 14, 2007
- Recorded: January 2006 – September 2007
- Genre: Video game music
- Length: 3:27:46
- Label: OverClocked ReMix
- Producer: Andrew Aversa (zircon)

OverClocked ReMix chronology
Project Chaos (2006)	Voices of the Lifestream (2007)	Thieves of Fate (2008)

Professional ratings
Review scores
Source	Rating
Pelit	5/5 stars
SquareSound	(90%)

Voices of the Lifestream is an unofficial tribute album released by OverClocked ReMix in honor of Nobuo Uematsu's score for the video game Final Fantasy VII. The album was released on September 14, 2007, to coincide with the 10th anniversary of Final Fantasy VII. Since its release, the collection has received praise from numerous video game sites and professional composers.

== Development ==
Production of Voices of the Lifestream began in January 2006 as a personal endeavor by OverClocked ReMix Judge and ReMixer Andrew "zircon" Aversa to recreate the soundtrack of Final Fantasy VII. In a director’s note, Aversa credits his nostalgic experiences with the game as his motivation towards the project. A private forum was created to house development on the project, with many community members assisting in the development of the track list. Development of the project lasted over 20 months, encompassing over 40 remixers credited with creating 45 tracks. The compilation was released on September 14, 2007, in correlation with the 10th anniversary of Final Fantasy VII's release. The tracks were primarily made available through digital distribution in lossless WAV and MP3 formats, with few physical copies being produced. Voices of the Lifestream is OC ReMix's ninth project to be released.

== Music video competition ==
In October 2007, OverClocked ReMix held a competition, in conjunction with Piano Squall and eStarland, regarding the creation of a music video set to a track from Voices of the Lifestream. There were three different categories to enter including Final Fantasy VII, anime, and original. The winners were awarded a signed limited edition of Voices of the Lifestream among other prizes, as well as having their video presented at anime and gaming conventions that OC ReMix attends. The contest ended on December 14. The winners were announced on the OverClocked ReMix forums two months later.

Final Fantasy VII Category

- Winner: "Compiled Memories" by sayde (David Lee)
- Runner-up: "Black-Winged Angel" by slkdragon (Chris Cook)
- Honorable Mention: "Wheels of Lifestream" by Big Paul (Paulo Augusto)

Anime Category

- Winner: "Final Moments of Clarity" by Mindeffects (Saša Tarbuk)
- Runner-up: "Sweetest Embrace" by Phantasmagoriat (Chris Studer)

Original Category

- Winner: "Stone Eyes" by Zethzen (Ian Cofino)
- Runner-up: "Lunatic Hero" by backseatstuff (Matt Furbush)

== Reception ==
Public reception has been generally positive, with Voices of the Lifestream being the most downloaded project created by OverClocked ReMix to date according to a BitTorrent tracker on its website.

Editors of video game music websites, and video game websites in general, have been typically positive in their reviews. Kotaku referred to the project as being "a massive labor of love". Game Tabs has called the compilation a "masterpiece", expressing surprise at the quality of the compilation, but criticizing the vocals in some of the tracks. SquareSound gave the project a 90%, praising the musicianship exhibited by the OC ReMix community and recommending immediate download. SquareSound also criticized some of the tracks, feeling that they got "lost" attempting to reinterpret the source material. In an advance review, Jayson Napolitano of Music4Games called Voices of the Lifestream "one of the most impressive and encompassing listening experiences in the world of video game music".

News of the album is not limited to the United States. Finnish video game magazine Pelit gave the album a score of 5 out of 5 stars, lauding its diverse content but also pointing out a few unnecessary tracks which should have been excluded from the album while it was still in development. Voices of the Lifestream was nonetheless described as "the most interesting event on the Internet music scene in a long time".

Two professional video game composers have also given their approval of the compilation. Tommy Tallarico, video game composer and co-creator of Video Games Live, praised the album, stating that "OC ReMix has done it again!" and was impressed with the talent from the OCR community. Michael Gluck also voiced approval of the compilation, stating "…this is without a doubt the most fantastic project to ever hit the videogame music scene".

== Track listing ==
The project is spread out over four discs although few physical copies of the album are available. Most of the content was distributed via download links and torrents. The discs are named after the titles made for the Compilation of Final Fantasy VII: Crisis Core, Dirge of Cerberus, Advent Children, and Last Order.

All music is composed by Nobuo Uematsu.

Disc I – Crisis
No.	Title	Arranger(s)	Length
1.	"Deliverance of the Heart" ("Heart of Anxiety")	pixietricks, zircon	4:26
2.	"Every Story Begins with a Name" ("Opening – Bombing Mission")	Big Giant Circles	6:46
3.	"No Such Thing As the Promised Land" ("Mako Reactor")	sephfire, SGX	5:12
4.	"Materia Junkie" ("Under the Rotting Pizza" ~ "The Oppressed")	LuIzA	4:17
5.	"Full Frontal Assault" ("Let the Battles Begin!")	norg, SnappleMan	5:06
6.	"Too Much Fighting" ("Fanfare")	Another Soundscape	4:52
7.	"Damn Those Turks!" ("Turks' Theme")	Daniel Baranowsky	3:11
8.	"Adrenalyne Kyck" ("Hurry!")	Big Giant Circles, Liontamer, zircon	4:10
9.	"Nomura Limit" ("Fight On!")	zircon	3:15
10.	"Son of Chaos" ("Shinra Company")	Xaleph	5:38
11.	"Lunatic Moon" ("Red XIII's Theme" ~ "Cosmo Canyon")	Sixto Sounds, zircon	3:56
12.	"motor crazycycle" ("Crazy Motorcycle")	tefnek	4:55
Total length:			55:44

Disc II – Dirge
No.	Title	Arranger(s)	Length
1.	"Short Skirts" ("Tifa's Theme")	djpretzel, Vigilante	3:53
2.	"Valse Aeris" ("Flowers Blooming in the Church" ~ "Aerith's Theme")	Jeremy Robson	7:21
3.	"Embraced Empathy" ("Dear to the Heart")	Hemophiliac	3:03
4.	"Serenity" ("Main Theme of FINAL FANTASY VII")	Mustin	5:29
5.	"A Life Without Parole" ("Desert Wasteland")	Dhsu	4:52
6.	"Scenes from a Memory" ("On That Day, Five Years Ago...")	Sixto Sounds, Suzumebachi, zircon	3:34
7.	"Golden Fields" ("Farm Boy")	Geoffrey Taucer, Tepid	3:39
8.	"Crystal Sermon" ("The Prelude")	Trenthian	5:03
9.	"Chasing the Storm" ("In Search of the Man in Black")	Rellik	2:39
10.	"Sephiroth's Wake" ("Trail of Blood")	Tweek	4:38
11.	"JENOVA Celestial" ("J-E-N-O-V-A")	bLiNd	4:08
12.	"Mark of the Beatsmith" ("Mark of a Traitor")	Hy Bound	7:20
Total length:			55:39

Disc III – Advent
No.	Title	Arranger(s)	Length
1.	"Suco de Melancia" ("Costa del Sol")	Red Tailed Fox	4:28
2.	"Stone Eyes" ("The Great Warrior")	Shnabubula	4:09
3.	"Daydreaming Again" ("Words Drowned by Fireworks")	Pot Hocket	3:35
4.	"Alien Exploration" ("Gold Saucer" ~ "Cid's Theme")	Trenthian	3:52
5.	"Golden Feathers" ("Racing Chocobos – Place Your Bets!")	Another Soundscape	3:58
6.	"Midnight at Club Corel" ("Mining Town")	Red Tailed Fox, Shnabubula	6:23
7.	"Ahead On Our Rave" ("On Our Way")	FFmusic Dj	5:33
8.	"Kweh!" ("Electric de Chocobo")	Darangen	2:22
9.	"The Crossroads" ("Cid's Theme")	Jovette Rivera	4:50
10.	"Fading Entity" ("Listen to the Cries of the Planet")	bLiNd, Leifo	6:01
11.	"Frozen Landscape" ("Buried in Snow")	Tweek	4:07
Total length:			49:18

Disc IV – Order
No.	Title	Arranger(s)	Length
1.	"Sleep, My Sephy" ("Judgment Day")	Pot Hocket	4:38
2.	"Collision" ("The North Cave")	Darangen	4:45
3.	"Airships Make Me Happy" ("The Highwind Takes to the Skies")	Star Salzman	5:03
4.	"Hydrophone Breakdown" ("Secret of the Deep Sea")	JigginJonT	4:31
5.	"Omnislash" ("Hurry Up!")	Fishy	4:10
6.	"Rare Square" ("Countdown")	bustatunez, The Orichalcon	4:04
7.	"Jenova Returns" ("J-E-N-O-V-A" ~ "Jenova Complete")	Steffan Andrews	4:57
8.	"Beginning of the End" ("Birth of a God")	bLiNd	4:18
9.	"Black Wing Metamorphosis" ("One-Winged Angel")	bLiNd, Fishy, pixietricks, Sixto Sounds, Steffan Andrews, Suzumebachi, tefnek	3:19
10.	"The Golden Ivories of Gaia" (Various Themes)	Bladiator	5:58
Total length:			45:43
