= AnimeFest =

Anime convention in Arlington, Texas

Coordinates: 32.750379°N 97.0848727°W

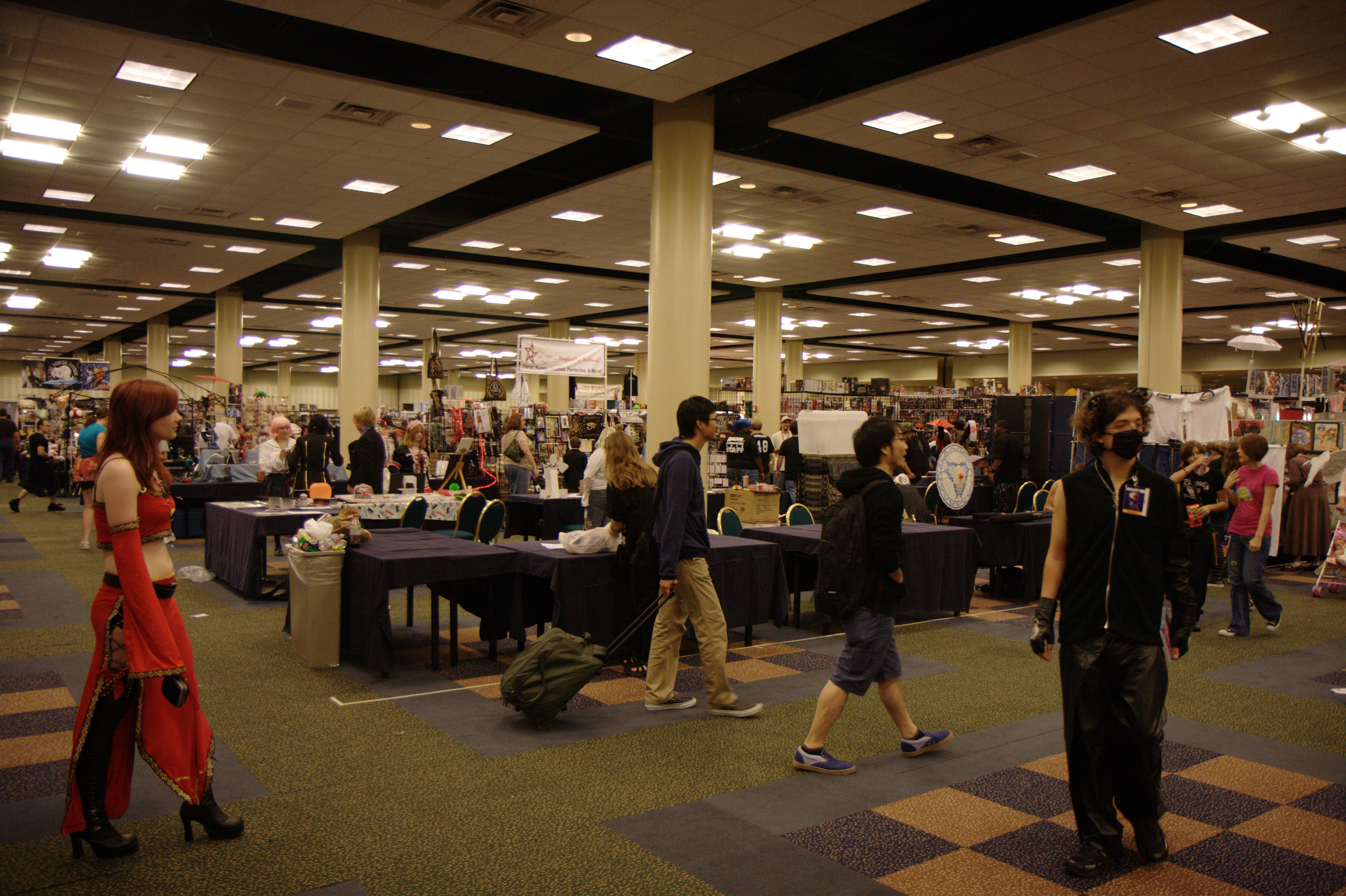
- AnimeFest 2008
- Status: Inactive
- Venue: Loews Arlington Hotel
- Location: Arlington, Texas
- Country: United States
- Inaugurated: 1992
- Attendance: 10,751
- Organizer: World Fandom

AnimeFest is an inactive four-day anime convention held during August at the Loews Arlington Hotel in Arlington, Texas.

== Programming ==
The convention typically offers an art show, autograph sessions, cosplay contests, dealers room, gaming, and a masquerade.

== History ==
In 2012, the convention moved from the Hyatt Regency Dallas to the Sheraton Dallas Downtown Hotel. A-Kon also used the same hotel in 2012. AnimeFest in 2017 had issues with its autograph lines. AnimeFest 2020 was cancelled due to the COVID-19 pandemic. AnimeFest 2021 was initially cancelled due to the COVID-19 pandemic and an online event held in its place. The convention would later hold an event in December 2021. AnimeFest held its last full event in 2024, with future planned events being smaller.

AnimeFest in 2025 spun-out the GameFest portion of the convention. The first separate GameFest event was held from March 20-22, 2026 at The Westin Dallas Fort Worth Airport in Irving, Texas.

=== Event history ===
Dates	Location	Atten.	Guests
October 5, 1992	Richardson Courtyard by Marriott Hotel; Dallas, Texas	105	
February 5–7, 1993	Holiday Inn North Park Plaza Hotel; Dallas, Texas	450	Ichiro Arakaki, Matt Greenfield, Dwayne Jones, John Ledford, and Kevin Winkler.
November 6, 1993	Richardson Courtyard by Marriott Hotel; Dallas, Texas	140	Fred Patten.
November 4–6, 1994	Holiday Inn North Park Plaza Hotel; Dallas, Texas	500	
September 1–3, 1995	Doubletree Hotel at Park West; Dallas, Texas	600	
November 1–3, 1996	Clarion Hotel Dallas; Dallas, Texas	650	
September 4–7, 1998	Omni Dallas - Park West; Dallas, Texas	650	
September 3–6, 1999	Holiday Inn DFW Airport North; Dallas, Texas	750	Gilles Poitras.
August 31 - September 3, 2001	InterContinental Hotel Dallas; Dallas, Texas	1,300	Bôa, Steve Bennett, Bonsai Society of Dallas, Austell "DJ Asu" Callwood, Rodney "Largo" Caston, Scott Kurtz, Bruce Lewis, Mark Mandolia, Scott McNeil, Dan Minut, Kirby Morrow, Krista Perry, and Doug Smith.
August 30 - September 2, 2002	Hotel Inter-Continental Dallas; Dallas, Texas	1,800	Arik Renee Avila, Rodney "Largo" Caston, Michael Coleman, Dallas Kiyari Daiko, Kyle Hebert, Bruce Lewis, Kitaki Mayu, Scott McNeil, Kirby Morrow, Stephanie Nadolny, Chris Patton, Krista Perry, Monica Rial, Kristine Sa, Jan Scott-Frazier, and Serdar Yegulalp.
August 29 - September 1, 2003	Hotel Inter-Continental; Dallas, Texas	2,350	Arik Renee Avila, Greg Ayres, Emily DeJesus, Robert DeJesus, Michael Dobson, Tiffany Grant, Kyle Hebert, Kato Kazuhiko, Bruce Lewis, Mike McFarland, Scott McNeil, Vic Mignogna, Chris Moujaes, Move, Stephanie Nadolny, Dr. Susan Napier, Chris Patton, Krista Perry, Ramen and Rice, Xero Reynolds, Monica Rial, Aaron Romo, and Doug Smith.
September 3–6, 2004	Hyatt Regency Dallas - At Reunion Tower; Dallas, Texas	2,725	Greg Ayres, Beau Billingslea, Steve Blum, Johnny Yong Bosch, Kyle Hebert, Kumiko Kato, MAX, Mike McFarland, Jamie McGonnigal, Vic Mignogna, Chris Moujaes, Chris Patton, Krista Perry, Xero Reynolds, Monica Rial, Aaron Romo, Brianne Siddall, and Sean Teague.
September 2–5, 2005	Hyatt Regency at Reunion Tower; Dallas, Texas	3,301	Greg Ayres, Johnny Yong Bosch, Emily DeJesus, Robert DeJesus, Caitlin Glass, Kyle Hebert, Jonathan Klein, Bruce Lewis, Mike McFarland, Jamie McGonnigal, Scott McNeil, Randy Milholland, Krista Perry, Ramen and Rice, Xero Reynolds, Monica Rial, Maaya Sakamoto, Carrie Savage, Stephanie Sheh, Doug Smith, and Shinichirō Watanabe.
September 1–4, 2006	Hyatt Regency Dallas; Dallas, Texas	4,127	Yoshitoshi ABe, Greg Ayres, Chris Cason, Lindsay Cibos, Emily DeJesus, Robert DeJesus, Flow, Rivkah Greulich, Kyle Hebert, Jared Hodges, Taliesin Jaffe, Bruce Lewis, Jamie McGonnigal, Randy Milholland, Ramen and Rice, Monica Rial, Carrie Savage, Doug Smith, and Yasuyuki Ueda.
August 31 - September 3, 2007	Hyatt Regency Dallas; Dallas, Texas	4,629	Chris Ayres, Greg Ayres, Amelie Belcher, Beau Billingslea, Greg Dean, Emily DeJesus, Robert DeJesus, Quinton Flynn, Shukou Murase, Jeff Nimoy, Monica Rial, Dai Sato, and United Fellas.
August 29 - September 1, 2008	Hyatt Regency Dallas; Dallas, Texas		Hannah Alcorn, Christopher Ayres, Greg Ayres, Amelie Belcher, Emily DeJesus, Robert DeJesus, Jessie James Grelle, Matt Herms, Ross Hines, Steve Horton, Chuck Huber, Akiharu Ishii, Bruce Lewis, Jamie McGonnigal, Scott McNeil, Shuhei Morita, Carli Mosier, Dai Sato, J. Michael Tatum, and Jeong Mo Yang.
September 4–7, 2009	Hyatt Regency Dallas; Dallas, Texas		Troy Baker, David Doub, Chuck Huber, Shinji Kimura, Ramen and Rice, Dai Sato, Junichi Taniguchi, and Tsutchie.
September 3–6, 2010	Hyatt Regency Dallas; Dallas, Texas		Greg Ayres, David Doub, Kazuyoshi Katayama, Bruce Lewis, Nirgilis, Dai Sato, and J. Michael Tatum.
September 2–5, 2011	Hyatt Regency Dallas; Dallas, Texas		Greg Ayres, Amelie Belcher, Bowling for Soup, Leah Clark, Terri Doty, David Doub, J. Grant, Mel Hynes, Carrie Keranen, Cherami Leigh, Bruce Lewis, Dai Sato, Jan Scott-Frazier, Spike Spencer, J. Michael Tatum, and Cristina Vee.
August 31–September 3, 2012	Sheraton Dallas Downtown Hotel; Dallas, Texas		Robert Axelrod, Amelie Belcher, Mark Crilley, J. Grant, Mel Hynes, Mike Iverson, L33tStr33t Boys, Cherami Leigh, Bruce Lewis, Bryan Massey, Kristen McGuire, Koji Morimoto, Ramen and Rice, Dai Sato, Mark Stoddard, Tatsuyuki Tanaka, Greg Wicker, Sayo Yamamoto, and Yoshimitsu Yamashita.
August 30–September 2, 2013	Sheraton Dallas Downtown Hotel; Dallas, Texas		DJ Blade, Terri Doty, Tomohiko Ishii, Kenji Kamiyama, and Greg Wicker.
August 15–18, 2014	Sheraton Dallas Downtown Hotel; Dallas, Texas	10,297	Hiroyuki Aoyama, Amelie Belcher, Flow, Kazuhiro Furuhashi, Todd Haberkorn, Reuben Langdon, Yuri Lowenthal, Kristen McGuire, Shingo Natsume, Tara Platt, Dai Sato, Hiroshi Shimizu, Ian Sinclair, Alexis Tipton, Kimiko Ueno, and Eric Wile.
September 4–7, 2015	Sheraton Dallas Downtown Hotel; Dallas, Texas	10,090	Akai SKY, Hiroyuki Aoyama, Amelie Belcher, Jessica Gee-George, Grant George, Kristen McGuire, Ramen and Rice, Monica Rial, Jad Saxton, Hiroshi Shimizu, Ian Sinclair, Arina Tanemura, and Stephanie Young.
August 12–15, 2016	Sheraton Dallas Downtown Hotel; Dallas, Texas	10,751	Amelie Belcher, Mark Crilley, Toshio Furukawa, Fumi Hirano, Shino Kakinuma, Chikashi Kubota, Kristen McGuire, Erica Mendez, Kazuhiro Miwa, Shuhei Morita, Shingo Natsume, Melissa Ng, Gilles Poitras, Lindsay Seidel, Micah Solusod, Akemi Takada, Austin Tindle, Greg Wicker, Lisle Wilkerson, Robert Woodhead, and Apphia Yu (Ayu Sakata).
August 17–20, 2017	Sheraton Dallas Downtown Hotel; Dallas, Texas		Amelie Belcher, Morgan Berry, Eunyoung Choi, Christophe Ferreira, Jessie James Grelle, Tadashi Hiramatsu, Motonobu Hori, Caleb Hyles, Jeremy Inman, Jerry Jewell, Kenji Kamiyama, Shigeto Koyama, Mitsurou Kubo, LM.C, Daman Mills, Dr. Susan Napier, Monica Rial, Yoshiki Sakurai, Dai Sato, Ian Sinclair, Micah Solusod, Sonny Strait, Atsuko Tanaka, Arina Tanemura, Atsumi Tanezaki, Tsutchie, Eric Vale, Greg Wicker, Sayo Yamamoto, Apphia Yu (Ayu Sakata), and Masaaki Yuasa.
August 17–20, 2018	Sheraton Dallas Hotel; Dallas, Texas		Mai Aizawa, Tia Ballard, Dawn M. Bennett, Jacob Browning, Ricco Fajardo, Naoya Fukushi, Erika Harlacher, Natalie Rose Hoover, Caleb Hyles, Roland Kelts, Helen McCarthy, Margaret McDonald, Tomotaka Misawa, Whitney Rodgers, J. Michael Tatum, Christopher Wehkamp, Bennett White, Greg Wicker, Lisle Wilkerson, Takanori Yamamura, and Apphia Yu (Ayu Sakata).
August 16–19, 2019	Sheraton Dallas Hotel; Dallas, Texas		Yoshitoshi ABe, Hiroyuki Aoyama, Amelie Belcher, Leon Chiro, and Shingo Natsume.
July 31, 2021	Online convention		
December 17-19, 2021	Sheraton Dallas Hotel; Dallas, Texas		Bryn Apprill, Amelie Belcher, Kyle Hebert, Robert McCollum, Kyle Phillips, and Christopher Wehkamp.
July 29 - August 1, 2022	Sheraton Dallas Hotel; Dallas, Texas		Katelyn Barr, Amelie Belcher, Dani Chambers, Ray Chase, Robbie Daymond, Marissa Lenti, Joel McDonald, Ry McKeand, Max Mittelman, Molly Searcy, Micah Solusod, and Apphia Yu (Ayu Sakata).
July 28-31, 2023	Sheraton Dallas Hotel; Dallas, Texas		Amelie Belcher, Beau Billingslea, Melissa Fahn, The Geeky Seamstress, and Bryan Massey.
July 25-28, 2024	Loews Arlington Hotel; Arlington, Texas		Greg Ayres, Bryson Baugus, Amelie Belcher, Drew Breedlove, Kamen Casey, James Cheek, Aaron Dismuke, Ricco Fajardo, Cole Feuchter, Caleb Hyles, Corinne Sudberg, Kiba Walker, and Howard Wang.
