= Anime Festival Wichita =

Anime convention in Wichita, Kansas, United States

Coordinates: 37°40′58″N 97°20′29″W

- Status: Active
- Genre: Anime, Manga, Gaming
- Venue: Hyatt Regency Wichita
- Location: Wichita, Kansas
- Country: United States
- Inaugurated: 2005
- Attendance: 4,000 in 2014
- Organizer: Wolfmoon Productions
- Website: http://www.afwcon.com/

Anime Festival Wichita (Anime Festival of Wichita or AFW) is an annual three-day anime convention held in June or August at the Hyatt Regency Wichita in Wichita, Kansas.

== Programming ==
The convention typically offers an Anime Music Video contest, anime viewing rooms, costume contests, manga library, panels, tabletop gaming, vendors, and video gaming tournaments. The convention has 24-hour programming.

== History ==
Anime Festival Wichita started in 2005 as a one-day event under the name Wichita Anime Festival. Voice actress Cassandra Hodges was scheduled to attend in 2011, but died prior to the convention. Anime Festival Wichita 2020 and 2021 was cancelled due to the COVID-19 pandemic.

=== Event history ===
Dates	Location	Atten.	Guests
August 6, 2005	Orpheum Theatre; Wichita, Kansas		
August 18–20, 2006	Best Western North; Wichita, Kansas	1,234	Stephanie Celeste, Michael Gluck, Tiffany Grant, Liza Kaplan, Peter Pixie, and Team Royal Sabi.
August 17–19, 2007	Best Western Wichita North Hotel & Suites; Wichita, Kansas		Stephanie Celeste, Vic Mignogna, Peter Pixie, Team Royal Sabi, and Stephanie Yanez.
August 15–17, 2008	Best Western Wichita North Hotel & Suites; Wichita, Kansas		Kate Bristol, Peter Pixie, Sonny Strait, and Jen Taylor.
July 10–12, 2009	Hyatt Regency Wichita; Wichita, Kansas		Robert Axelrod, Stephanie Celeste, Caitlin Glass, Jerry Jewell, and Peter Pixie.
July 9–11, 2010	Hyatt Regency Wichita; Wichita, Kansas		Colleen Clinkenbeard, Samurai Dan Coglan, DJ Infam0us, Vic Mignogna, Peter Pixie, Eric Wile, and Travis Willingham.
July 8–10, 2011	Hyatt Regency Wichita; Wichita, Kansas		The 149th War Wolves, Airship Isabella, Troy Baker, Beard and Bean, Jillian Coglan, Samurai Dan Coglan, Peter Pixie, Eric Vale, and Darryl "Darth Artist" Woods.
June 29-July 1, 2012	Hyatt Regency Wichita; Wichita, Kansas	3,000 (est)	Beard and Bean, Johnny Yong Bosch, Jillian Coglan, Samurai Dan Coglan, Michelle Ann Dunphy, Eyeshine, Peter Pixie, and Laura Post.
July 12–14, 2013	Hyatt Regency Wichita; Wichita, Kansas		Beard and Bean, Quinton Flynn, Todd Haberkorn, Peter Pixie, and Lisle Wilkerson.
June 27–29, 2014	Hyatt Regency Wichita; Wichita, Kansas	4,000	Beard and Bean, Jillian Coglan, Samurai Dan Coglan, Lucien Dodge, Chuck Huber, Erica Mendez, Peter Pixie, and The Slants.
July 10–12, 2015	Hyatt Regency Wichita; Wichita, Kansas		Beard and Bean, Leah Clark, Rachael Messer, Peter Pixie, David Vincent, Ogawa Burukku, Susanne Lambdin, and Damien Zimmerman.
July 8–10, 2016	Hyatt Regency Wichita; Wichita, Kansas		Cynthia Cranz, Kyle Hebert, Samantha Inoue-Harte, Joel McDonald, Peter Pixie, and Ryter Rong.
June 23-25, 2017	Hyatt Regency Wichita; Wichita, Kansas		Jessica Calvello, Samurai Dan Coglan, Elizabeth Maxwell, and Kiba Walker.
June 29 - July 1, 2018	Hyatt Regency Wichita; Wichita, Kansas		Katelyn Barr, Samurai Dan Coglan, Caitlynn French, Tyson Rinehart, and Michael "Knightmage" Wilson.
August 23-25, 2019	Hyatt Regency Wichita; Wichita, Kansas		Morgan Berry, Mary Claypool, Les E. Claypool III, Jason Charles Miller, and Tara Sands.
June 24-26, 2022	Hyatt Regency Wichita; Wichita, Kansas		John Gremillion, Mikey Mason, and Stephanie Nadolny.
June 23-25, 2023	Hyatt Regency Wichita; Wichita, Kansas		Aaron Campbell, Ray Hurd, Mikey Mason, and Phil Parsons.
June 21-23, 2024	Hyatt Regency Wichita; Wichita, Kansas		Kevin M. Connolly, Mikey Mason, Corinne Sudberg, and Marie Westbrook.
June 27-29, 2025	Hyatt Regency Wichita; Wichita, Kansas		Leraldo Anzaldua, Jessica Calvello, Alejandra Cazares, Jason Douglas, and Mikey Mason.
June 19-21, 2026	Hyatt Regency Wichita; Wichita, Kansas		Kevin M. Connolly, Mikey Mason, and Bryan Massey.
