= Kiba Walker =

American voice actor and drag performer

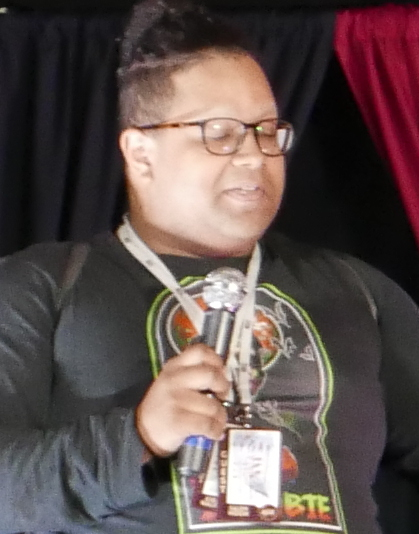
- Walker in 2024
- Born: 1994 or 1995 (age 30–31)
- Other name: Salem Moon
- Occupation: Voice actor
- Years active: 2016–2025
- Website: kibawalkervoices.com

Kiba Walker (born 1994 or 1995) is an American former voice actor, ADR director, and ADR script writer. They voiced major characters such as Caius Lao Bistail in The Titan's Bride, Kanji Koganegawa in Haikyu!! To The Top, Makio Tanihara in Horimiya, Taira no Kiyotsune in The Heike Story, Manabu-kun in Tomodachi Game, Yuuya Niyodo in Phantom of the Idol, Minoru Chiaki in Twilight Out of Focus, Meynard Swann in Clevatess, and Tasuku Tsubakino in Wind Breaker. They also performed as a drag queen under the drag persona Salem Moon. In 2025, several organizations and companies cut ties with Walker following allegations of sexual misconduct towards minors.

== Early life ==
Raised in Tacoma, Walker was originally a stage actor, including in college and community theater, but felt self-conscious about their appearance. Walker told KERA News about their experiences of struggling with auditions due to homophobia, fatphobia, and colorism. They went into voice acting to "do what [they] loved and be characters without having to worry about people judging [them] for [their] weight or anything".

== Acting career ==
Walker voiced numerous characters in anime dubs, including Caius Lao Bistail in The Titan's Bride, Kanji Koganegawa in Haikyu!! To The Top, Makio Tanihara in Horimiya, Taira no Kiyotsune in The Heike Story, Manabu-kun in Tomodachi Game, Yuuya Niyodo in Phantom of the Idol, Minoru Chiaki in Twilight Out of Focus, Meynard Swann in Clevatess, and Tasuku Tsubakino in Wind Breaker. They were a ADR director and ADR script writer for some of American dubbing company Ascendent Animation's dubs, including Ishida & Asakura, The Titan's Bride, and Everything for Demon King Evelogia. They appeared in several anime conventions, including SNAFU Con (2015-2017, 2019), Anime Banzai (2016, 2018), Anime Festival Wichita (2017), Anime Midwest (2021-2023), Colossalcon Texas (2022), Tokyo, OK (2022-2024), Ohayocon (2022-2025), Nan Desu Kan (2023), AnimeFest (2024), and Anime Los Angeles (2025).

In the mid-2010s, Walker began a career as drag performer Salem Moon after being inspired by RuPaul’s Drag Race. Salem Moon hosted an all-ages trivia night at Tulips FTW until the venue's landlord banned drag events after anti-LGBTQ organization Protect Texas Kids targeted the event. Walker told the Fort Worth Star-Telegram that they got social media death threats after right-wing journalist Tayler Hansen tweeted a Salem Moon video, and the event was targeted by Tarrant County Judge Tim O'Hare in May 2023. In response to Protect Texas Kids' harassment, Salem Moon helped raise $9,500 for protecting LGBTQ+ youth, sent to local nonprofit organization LGBTQ Saves.

In June 2025, Walker made their debut as a professional stage actor in the Circle Theatre Fort Worth's production of A Strange Loop, playing the protagonist Usher. Rich Lopez of Dallas Voice said: "Kiba Walker’s portrayal of Usher was front and center; a true home run. ... Walker masterfully navigated these profound struggles, delivering a captivating performance". Manuel Mendoza of The Dallas Morning News said: "Kiba Walker does a phenomenal job playing a potentially unlikeable character. Walker’s singing is both beautifully emotional and down-to-earth."

== Personal life ==
Walker is non-binary and their pronoun preference is "they/them, he/him, she/her, don’t care". Originally based in Litchfield Park, Arizona, as of 2023 Walker was based in Fort Worth.

== 2025 sexual harassment allegations and fallout ==
On July 31, 2025, Anime Corner reported on sexual harassment allegations made against Walker the day before, involving misconduct towards a minor dating to 2017. Walker reportedly said they would address the allegations before privating their Twitter/X accounts. This was followed by another set of child grooming allegations from another person, also made on July 31. In August 2025, Ascendent Animation revealed that they had fired Walker in 2021 for persistent misconduct, and that Walker was misrepresenting themself as president, founder or chief operating officer of the company through inaccurate press releases they sent without company authorization (including to Anime News Network) or on a Twitter/X account named @AscendedAnime.

In response to the allegations, LGBTQ+ organization Pride in Dallas cut ties with Walker, as did Arlington LGBTQ bar 1851 Club. BLits Games also did the same, recasting his role of Yoshino in Scoutmaster Season. Nan Desu Kan withdrew Walker's invitation to that year's edition. Ascendent Animation gained control of the AscendedAnime account and unblocked several voice actors said account blocked under Walker's control.

== Filmography ==
=== Anime ===
Year	Title	Role	Notes	Ref
2018	Junji Ito Collection	Ryou Tsukano		
2019	Knights of the Zodiac: Saint Seiya	Scylla Io		
2019	Kono Oto Tomare! Sounds of Life	Naoya		
2019	O Maidens in Your Savage Season	Additional voices		
2020	Black Clover	Paplo Espuma		
2020	Bofuri	Christmas Rose		
2020	Case File nº221: Kabukicho	Diana Oldoni		
2020	Haikyu!! To The Top,	Kanji Koganegawa		
2020	Ishida & Asakura	Oppai-Seijin	Writer, director	
2021	Back Arrow	Gote Gordon		
2021	Horimiya	Makio Tanihara		
2021	The Heike Story	Taira no Kiyotsune		
2021	86	Erwin Marcel		
2021	Edens Zero	Younger Foote Brother		
2021	My Hero Academia	Cider House leader		
2021	Magatsu Wahrheit	Jade		
2021	The Titan's Bride	Caius Lao Bistail	Writer, director	
2022	Blue Lock	Shoei Baro (Young)		
2022	Everything for Demon King Evelogia		Writer, director	
2022	Sasaki and Miyano	Higure		
2022	The Daily Life of the Immortal King	Additional voices		
2022	Tomodachi Game	Manabu-kun		
2022	Tsukimichi: Moonlit Fantasy	Eto		
2023	Oshi no Ko	LoveNow Director		
2023	Phantom of the Idol	Yuuya Niyodo		
2023	Shangri-La Frontier	Branch		
2023	Tomo-chan Is a Girl!	Kid Bullies		
2023	Twilight Out of Focus	Minoru Chiaki		
2025	Clevatess	Meynard Swann		
2025	Lazarus	Jill		
2025	Wind Breaker	Tasuku Tsubakino		

=== Video games ===
Year	Title	Role(s)	Ref
2016	Earthlock: Festival of Magic	Amon, Gnart	
2018	Camp Buddy	Keitaro Nagame, Yoshinori Nagira	
2019	Seiyuu Danshi	Haato	
2020	Genshin Impact	Kudari	
