= Kristine Sa =

- Born: Huỳnh Ngọc Nhã Yến; June 6, 1982 (age 44); Song Be, Vietnam
- Origin: Toronto, Canada
- Genres: Pop music, anison
- Occupations: Singer, songwriter, television host
- Instruments: Vocals, piano, guitar
- Years active: 2002–present
- Labels: Nemesis, Jellybean

Kristine Sa (June 6, 1982) is a Vietnamese-born Canadian singer and songwriter.

== Career ==
Sa was born in Song Be, a small town near Saigon (Ho Chi Minh City) in Vietnam. When she was six, her family moved to Canada and she grew up in Toronto. She enjoyed singing and performing since she was little, and attended a special performing arts school in ninth grade. She was in a television pilot called Wexford. When she was in high school, a friend of hers contacted Nemesis Records to look at her webpage and the CEO Minh-Dan Pham was interested in her writing. She sent in a demo cover of "Unbreak My Heart" and a self-written song and was soon signed.

While she was a college student at York University, she released her debut album I Never Knew in 2002. It contains a mix of songs written and performed by Sa with what Steve Diabo of Animefringe calls "heartfelt ballads and experimental pop". It was marketed mostly through online radio stations, selling in Taiwan, Australia, and the United Kingdom. She toured in the United States, and became popular on the Internet and the anime convention circuit, including AnimeFest in Dallas in 2002, and FanimeCon in San Jose in 2003. She continued her career with her second album, Rebirth in 2004.

In 2005, she released two albums under the anime project: AnimeToonz3 which has remixes of anime theme songs from Gundam Seed, Inuyasha, Cowboy Bebop, Ranma ½, Urusei Yatsura and Candy Candy. The albums are grouped in Lemon and Lime editions. Jonathan Mays of Anime News Network wrote that Sa's work on the AnimeToonz project was a "quality effort with reasonably good results." and "they should be proud of themselves for pulling the Animetoonz franchise out of the gutter and into the spotlight again.", although he critiqued some of Sa's renditions for consistency in the Inuyasha track "Every Heart" and the Cowboy Bebop track Real Folk Blues.

Her next studio album Hopeless Romantic was released in 2007.

Known in the anime community for her involvement in Funimation Entertainment's US releases of Suzuka in 2005, One Piece in 2007, and Ouran High School Host Club in 2008.

She has hosted and produced Vietnamese American talk-shows The Kristine Sa Show on VAN-TV, Up Close and Personal with Kristine Sa on VHN-TV, and "Heart to Heart with Kristine Sa" on SBTN.

Sa has mentioned influences from women singers Jewel, Celine Dion, and Sarah McLachlan. She also is inspired by Vietnamese music, especially with its unique instruments.

== Personal life ==
Her older sister is singer Tâm Đoan.

Named Yen Huynh at birth, but took her step father's surname in her later years prior to signing with Nemesis.

== Discography ==
Albums

- I Never Knew (Nemesis, 2002)
- Rebirth (Nemesis, 2004)
- AnimeToonz3: Lemon Edition (Jellybean, 2005)
- AnimeToonz3: Lime Edition (Jellybean, 2005)
- Hopeless Romantic (Nemesis, 2007)
- Lonely Asylum: The Demo Collection (independent release, 2010)
