= Kent Williams (voice actor) =

American voice actor

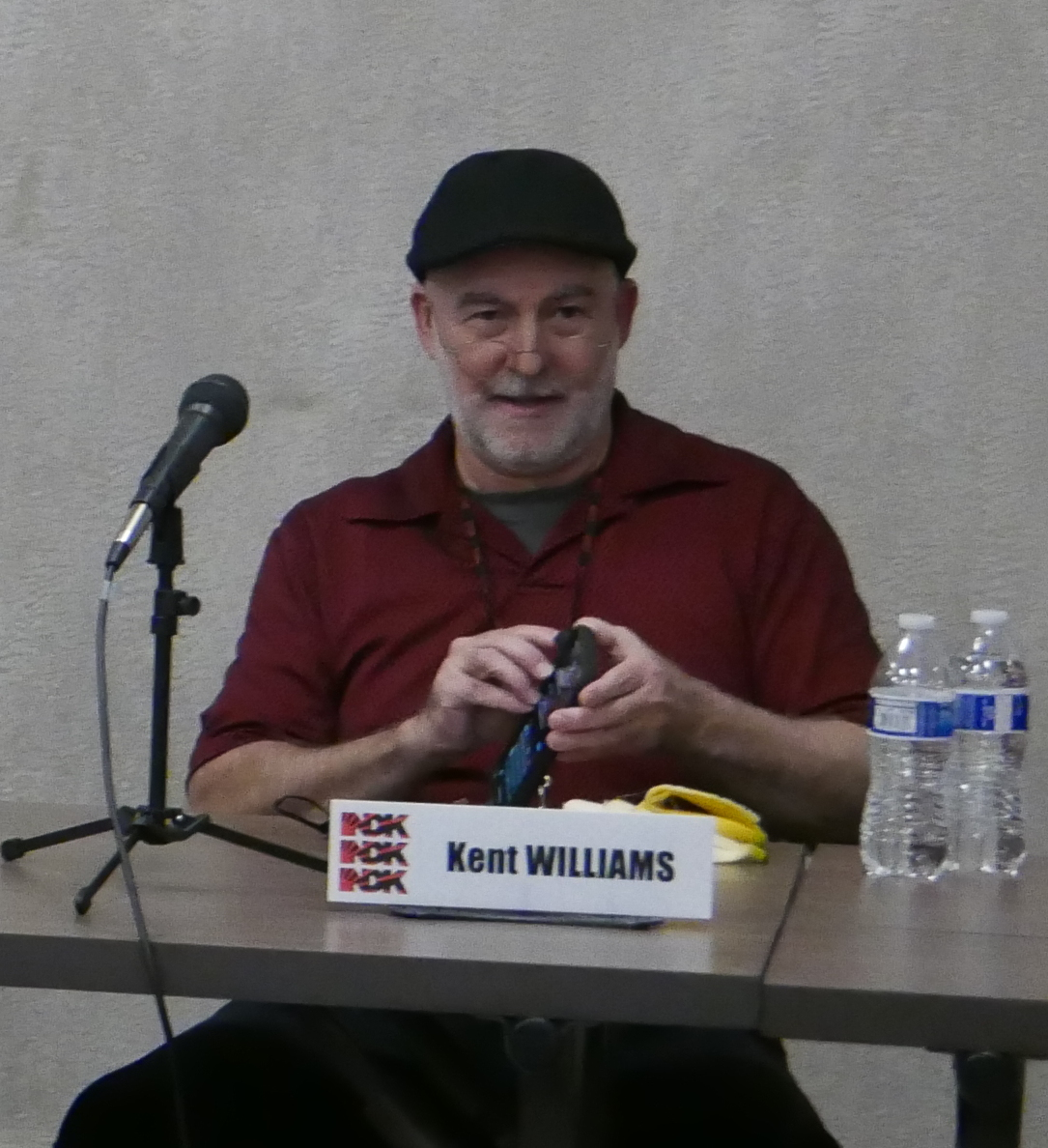
- Williams at Nan Desu Kan 2021
- Born: Commerce, Texas, U.S.
- Occupation: Voice actor
- Years active: 2000–present
- Children: 1

Kent Williams is an American voice actor who works on English dubs of Japanese anime. He is known as the voice of Mercenary Tao, Dr. Gero, and Supreme Kai in the Dragon Ball franchise, Father in Fullmetal Alchemist: Brotherhood, Mr. Compress in My Hero Academia, the Judge in the Ace Attorney anime series, and Dr. Hatori Sohma in the original Fruits Basket series, as well as its 2019 reboot.

== Filmography ==
=== Anime series ===
List of voice performances in anime series
Year	Title	Role	Notes	Ref.
2000	Dragon Ball Z	King, Android 20, Mercenary Tao, Supreme Kai, Old Supreme Kai		
2002	YuYu Hakusho	Narrator/Jorge Saotome/Blue Ogre, Chu		
2003	Fruits Basket	Dr. Hatori Soma	Also 2019 reboot	
2008	One Piece	Kuro, Raoul, Scorpion, Shura, Dr Vegapunk	Funimation dub	
2008	Ouran High School Host Club	Yoshio Otori		
2008	Darker than Black	M.A.O		
2009	Kenichi: The Mightiest Disciple	Akisame Kōetsuji		
2010	RIN ~Daughters of Mnemosyne~	Professor		
2010	Fullmetal Alchemist: Brotherhood	Father		
2010	Initial D: Fourth Stage	Bunta Fujiwara		
2010	Phantom ~Requiem for the Phantom~	Scythe		
2012	Hetalia: World Series	Turkey		
2012	Shangri-La	Momoko		
2012	Shakugan no Shana	Alastor	Funimation dub	
2013	The Future Diary	Deus ex Machina		
2013	Fairy Tail	Jura		
2014	Space Dandy	Perry		
2014	Jormungand	Curry		
2015	Assassination Classroom	Lovro		
2015	Ninja Slayer	Narrator		
2015	Nobunagun	Nobunagun	Lead role	
2015	The Heroic Legend of Arslan	Kharlan		
2016	Rage of Bahamut: Genesis	Azazel		
2016	Planetarian	Older Junker		
2016	Chaos Dragon	Krama		
2016	Tales of Zestiria the X	King of Hyland		
2016	Monster Hunter Stories: Ride On	Narrator		
2016	Drifters	Sundance Kid		
2016	Touken Ranbu: Hanamaru	Taroutachi		
2016	Alderamin on the Sky	Emperor		
2016	Izetta: The Last Witch	Benoit		
2016	Trickster	Kensuke's Dad		
2016	Joker Game	Satomura		
2017	Dragon Ball Super	Supreme Kai, Old Supreme Kai, Kibito Kai		
2017	The Saga of Tanya the Evil	Severin Bientot		
2017	ACCA: 13-Territory Inspection Dept.	Qualm		
2017	CHAOS;CHILD	Shuuichi		
2017	Chain Chronicle – The Light of Haecceitas –	Gilbert		
2017	All Out!!	Ikuta		
2017	Tales of Zestiria the X	King		
2017	Interviews with Monster Girls	Vice Principal		
2017	Tsuki ga Kirei	Ryuunosuke		
2017	The Royal Tutor	Dmitri		
2017	Gosick	Jupiter Roger		
2017	Samurai Warriors	Narrator		
2017	Restaurant to Another World	Butler		
2017	Star Blazers: Space Battleship Yamato 2199	Osamu Yamanami		
2018	The Morose Mononokean	Nobou		
2018	Ace Attorney	Judge	Main role	
2018	Darling in the Franxx	Dr. Franxx		
2018	Tokyo Ghoul:re	Yoshitoki Washu		
2018	Golden Kamuy	Nagakura		
2018	My Hero Academia	Mr. Compress		
2018	Lord of Vermilion: The Crimson King	Grumman		
2018	B't X	Teppei's Father		
2018	Steins;Gate 0	Nakabachi		
2018	That Time I Got Reincarnated as a Slime	Rigurd		
2018	Hinomaru Sumo	Yamatokuni		
2018	Radiant	Santori		
2018	Zombie Land Saga	Okoba		
2018	Double Decker! Doug & Kirill	Dorman		
2019	Dr. Stone	Byakuya Ishigami		
2019	Arifureta: From Commonplace to World's Strongest	Ishtar Langbard		
2020	Uzaki-chan Wants to Hang Out!	Akihiko Asai		
2020	The Millionaire Detective Balance: Unlimited	Chōsuke Nakamoto		
2020	By the Grace of the Gods	Reinbach Jamil		
2021	Wave, Listen to Me!	Takarada		
2021	Full Dive	Narrator		
2021	The Prince of Tennis II Hyotei vs. Rikkai Game of Future	Michael		
2021	Life Lessons with Uramichi Oniisan	God		
2021	Kageki Shojo!!	Hachi		
2021	The Duke of Death and His Maid	Rob		
2021	Hortensia Saga	Didier Viardot		
2022	Tribe Nine	Narrator		
2022	Lucifer and the Biscuit Hammer	Noi Crezant		
2023	Vinland Saga	Narrator	Season 2	
2023	Ayaka: A Story of Bonds and Wounds	Inou		
2023	TenPuru	Harukaze		
2023	Saint Cecilia and Pastor Lawrence	Grandpa		
2024	Solo Leveling	Go Gun-hee		
2024	Banished from the Hero's Party	Cardinal Lub		
2024	Frieren	Lernen		
2024	Demon Lord, Retry! R	Mikimoto		
2025	Dragon Ball Daima	Supreme Kai		
2025	To Be Hero X	Micky		
2026	Daemons of the Shadow Realm	Gonzo Kagemori		
2026	Witch Hat Atelier	Nolnoa		

=== Animation ===
- Death Battle – Bruce Wayne
- Red vs. Blue – Surge
- RWBY – Ghira Belladonna

=== Film/special ===
List of voice performances in film and television specials
Year	Title	Role	Notes	Ref.
2000	Dragon Ball: Mystical Adventure	Mercenary Tao	Funimation dub	
2001	Dragon Ball Z: Lord Slug	Medamatcha	Funimation dub	
2003	Dragon Ball Z: Broly – The Legendary Super Saiyan	Krang	Funimation dub	
2003	Dragon Ball Z: Super Android 13!	Dr. Gero/Android 20	Funimation dub	
2005	Lupin the 3rd: Island of Assassins	Doc		
2006	Dragon Ball Z: Fusion Reborn	Janemba		
2009	Evangelion: 1.0 You Are (Not) Alone	Kozo Fuyutsuki	Funimation/Okratron 5000 dub	
2011	Evangelion: 2.0 You Can (Not) Advance	Kozo Fuyutsuki	Funimation/Okratron 5000 dub	
2011	Hetalia Paint it, White!	Turkey		
2013	Shakugan no Shana: The Movie	Alastor		
2013	Wolf Children	Tendo		
2014	Evangelion: 3.0 You Can (Not) Redo	Kozo Fuyutsuki		
2014	Dragon Ball Z: Battle of Gods	Old Supreme Kai, Kibito Kai		
2015	Ghost in the Shell: The New Movie	Kuwahara		
2016	Rurouni Kenshin Part I: Origins	Aritomo Yamagata		
2016	Escaflowne	Goau Fanel	Funimation dub	
2017	Genocidal Organ	Defense Minister of Georgia		
2017	Black Butler	Kujo		
2017	Shin Godzilla	Prime Minister Okouchi		
2019	One Piece: Episode of East Blue	Kuro		
2019	Human Lost	Prime Minister		
2019	One Piece: Episode of Skypiea	Shura		
2020	My Hero Academia: Heroes Rising	Mr. Compress		
2020	Galaxy Express 999: Eternal Fantasy	Conductor		
2020	City Hunter: Shinjuku Private Eyes	Vince Ingrando		
2020	Goblin Slayer: Goblin's Crown	Dwarf Priest		

=== Video games ===
List of voice performances in video games
Year	Title	Role	Notes	Ref.
2004	Dragon Ball Z: Supersonic Warriors	Dr. Gero		
2004	Dragon Ball Z: Budokai 3	Android 20, Supreme Kai, Kibito Kai, Old Supreme Kai		
2006	Dragon Ball: Advanced Adventure	Mercenary Tao		
2008	One Piece: Unlimited Adventure	Spandam		
2009	Dragon Ball: Revenge of King Piccolo	Mercenary Tao		
2012	Borderlands 2	Incinerator Clayton, Corporal Reiss,		
2014	Dragon Ball Z: Battle of Z	Dr. Gero		
2014	Borderlands: The Pre-Sequel!	Leonard, Rabid Adams		
2016	Dragon Ball Xenoverse 2	Janemba, Old Supreme Kai		
2018	Dragon Ball FighterZ	Supreme Kai, Elder Kai		
2020	Dragon Ball Z: Kakarot	Android 20, Supreme Kai, Old Supreme Kai, Kibito Kai, Elder Kai, Mercenary Tao		
