= Wendy Powell =

American voice actress

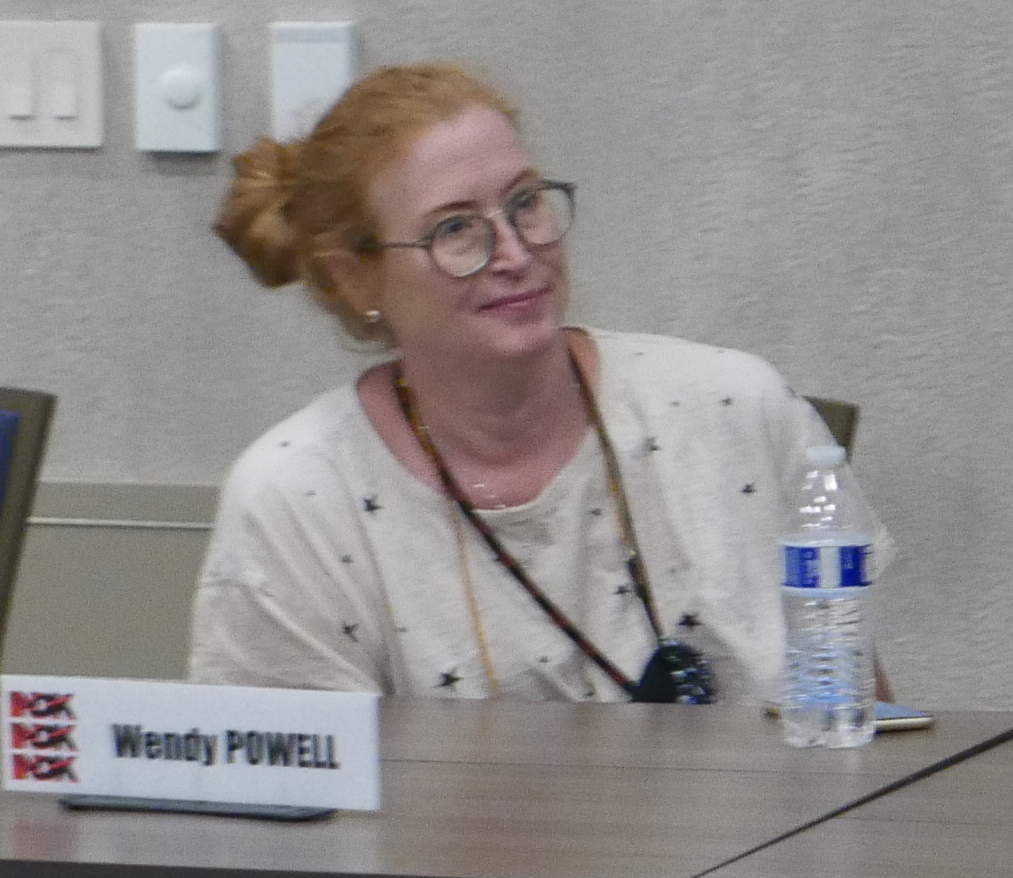
- Powell at Nan Desu Kan 2021
- Occupation: Voice actress
- Spouse: Todd Cook (m. 2011)
- Children: 1

Wendy Powell is an American voice actress and agent, best known for her work in anime dubs. Some of her notable roles include Envy from Fullmetal Alchemist, Miss Merry Christmas from One Piece, and Mukuro from YuYu Hakusho. She was married on March 19, 2011.

== Filmography ==
=== Anime series ===
List of voice performances in anime series
Year	Title	Role	Notes	Ref.
2002	YuYu Hakusho	Mukuro		
2003	Blue Gender	Amick		
2003	Fruits Basket (2001)	Kyo's Mother		
2004	Fullmetal Alchemist	Envy		
2005	Baki the Grappler	Emi		
2006	Negima!	Kasuga		
2006	Trinity Blood	Paula "Lady Death"		
2008	Claymore	Ilena		
2008	Shin Chan	The Fever Demon	Funimation dub	
2009	Shigurui: Death Frenzy	Iku		
2009	D.Gray-man	Hevlaska		
2009	One Piece	Miss Merry Christmas	Funimation dub	
2010	RIN: Daughters of Mnemosyne	Informant		
2010	Fullmetal Alchemist: Brotherhood	Envy		
2010	Birdy the Mighty: Decode	Irma		
2011	Chaos;HEAd	Katsuko Momose		
2012	Princess Jellyfish	Tsukimi's Mother		
2012	Sekirei: Pure Engagement	Kochou		
2012	Shiki	Yasuyo		
2013	Last Exile: Fam, the Silver Wing	Roshanak Babar		
2015	Heavy Object	Ayami		
2017	Sakura Quest	Kiyo		
2017	Kino's Journey -the Beautiful World- the Animated Series	President		
2017	Star Blazers: Space Battleship Yamato 2199	Saleluya Larleta		
2018	Overlord II	Rigrit Bers Caurau		
2019	B't X Neo	Madonna		
2019	Fruits Basket	Kyo's Mother		
2020	Thermae Romae	Yoshizawa, Asako, Hiruko		
2021	Suppose a Kid from the Last Dungeon Boonies Moved to a Starter Town	Locomo		
2022	The Prince of Tennis	Sumire Ryuzaki		
2022	Iroduku: The World in Colors	Kohaku Tsukishiro (old woman)		
2023	Vinland Saga	Emma	Season 2	
2025	The Apothecary Diaries	Madam	Season 2	
2025	Yakuza Fiancé: Raise wa Tanin ga Ii	Granny		
2025	Anne Shirley	Mrs. Blewett		
2026	Daemons of the Shadow Realm	Yamaha Ono		

=== Film ===
List of voice performances in film
Year	Title	Role	Notes	Ref.
2013	Wolf Children	Mrs. Nirasaki		
2020	City Hunter: Shinjuku Private Eyes	Golden Gai Proprietress		

=== Video games ===
List of voice performances in video games
Year	Title	Role	Notes	Ref.
2004	BloodRayne 2	Kestral		
2014	Borderlands: The Pre-Sequel!	Hanna, Mysterious Guardian		
2019	Borderlands 3	Azalea, Hag, Crapshooter		
