= List of Nura: Rise of the Yokai Clan episodes =

The anime television series Nura: Rise of the Yokai Clan, produced by Studio Deen, is based on the manga series of the same name written and illustrated by Hiroshi Shiibashi. The series is directed by Junji Nishimura with Natsuko Takahashi as scriptwriter and Mariko Oka as character designer. Kohei Tanaka composed the series' music. The series follows Rikuo Nura, a human by day and a yōkai by night, as he is destined to become the Third Heir of the Nura Clan. With the help of friends and allies, Rikuo must stop various opposing factions from usurping his position.

The first season ran for 24 episodes and aired from July 6, 2010, to December 21, 2010, on Yomiuri TV and other channels. A second season titled Nura: Rise of the Yokai Clan – Demon Capital ran for 24 episodes and aired from July 5, 2011, to December 20, 2011, on Yomiuri TV and other channels. The series is directed by Michio Fukuda with the cast from the first season returning to reprise their roles. In the United States and Canada, the English dub of the anime was broadcast on Viz Media's online network, Neon Alley. Two additional 23-minute OVAs were subsequently released on December 4, 2012, and March 4, 2013, after Demon Capital finished. They were bundled with the limited edition releases of volumes 24 and 25 of the manga.

== Series overview ==
| Season | Episodes | Japanese airdates | |
| Season | Episodes | First aired | Last aired |
|---|---|---|---|
| 1 | 24 | July 6, 2010 | December 21, 2010 |
| 2 | 24 | July 5, 2011 | December 20, 2011 |

== Episodes ==
=== Nura: Rise of the Yokai Clan (2010) ===
| No. | Title | Original airdate | English airdate |
|---|---|---|---|
| 1 | "Becoming the Lord of Pandemonium"; Transliteration: "Chimimoryō no Nushi to Nare" (Japanese: 魑魅魍魎の主となれ) | July 6, 2010 | October 2, 2012 |
| 2 | "Poison Wings Flutter in the Bamboo Thicket"; Transliteration: "Dokubane wa Shikurin ni Mau" (Japanese: 毒羽根は竹林に舞う) | July 13, 2010 | October 13, 2012 |
| 3 | "Yura Keikain and the Kiyojuji Paranormal Patrol"; Transliteration: "Keikain Yura to Kiyojūji Kaikitanteidan" (Japanese: 花開院ゆらと清十字怪奇探偵団) | July 20, 2010 | October 20, 2012 |
| 4 | "The Rat of Darkness Devours the Cat"; Transliteration: "Yami no Nezumi wa Neko o Kurau" (Japanese: 闇の鼠は猫を喰らう) | July 27, 2010 | October 27, 2012 |
| 5 | "Red Plum Blossoms on the Demons' Mountain"; Transliteration: "Onisumuyama ni Akakiume wa Saku" (Japanese: 鬼棲む山に紅き梅は咲く) | August 3, 2010 | November 3, 2012 |
| 6 | "A Trap Is Set on the Evil Mountain"; Transliteration: "Ma no Yama ni Shikumareshi Wana" (Japanese: 魔の山に仕組まれし罠) | August 10, 2010 | November 10, 2012 |
| 7 | "Darkness Moves on the Night of the New Moon"; Transliteration: "Shingetsu no Yoru ni Yami ga Ugoita" (Japanese: 新月の夜に闇が動いた) | August 17, 2010 | November 17, 2012 |
| 8 | "Cold-Blooded Umewakamaru!"; Transliteration: "Umewakamaru, Muzu!" (Japanese: 梅若丸、無残!) | August 24, 2010 | November 24, 2012 |
| 9 | "Gyuki's Beloved Nura Clan"; Transliteration: "Gyūki no Aishita Nura-gumi" (Japanese: 牛鬼の愛した奴良組) | August 31, 2010 | December 1, 2012 |
| 10 | "Eating the Fruit from Beyond the Evil Mirror"; Transliteration: "Makyō Kitarite Kajitsu o Kurau" (Japanese: 魔鏡来りて果実を喰らう) | September 7, 2010 | December 8, 2012 |
| 11 | "The Vanguard Wind Blows from the West"; Transliteration: "Senjin no Kaze, Nishi no Kata Yori" (Japanese: 先陣の風、西の方より) | September 14, 2010 | December 15, 2012 |
| 12 | "Tamazuki and the Seven Shadows " Transliteration: "Tamazuki to Nanatsu no Kage" (Japanese: 玉章と七つの影) | September 21, 2010 | December 22, 2012 |
| 12.5 | "Lord Gyuki's Rebellion: The Whole Story " Transliteration: "Gyūki-sama Muhon, Tenmatsu" (Japanese: 牛鬼様謀反、顛末) | September 28, 2010 | April 2, 2013 |
| 13 | "The Inugamigyobu Tanuki Tamazuki's Beckoning " Transliteration: "Inugamigyōbu Danuki Tamazuki no Temaneki" (Japanese: 隠神刑部狸玉章の手招き) | October 5, 2010 | April 2, 2013 |
| 14 | "Fierce Fire and Sudden Rain " Transliteration: "Gōka to Shūu" (Japanese: 劫火と驟雨) | October 12, 2010 | August 20, 2013 |
| 15 | "The Fighting Girls " Transliteration: "Tōju, Hyakka Ryōran" (Japanese: 闘女、百花繚乱) | October 19, 2010 | August 20, 2013 |
| 16 | "The Sublime Spirit Burns Crimson " Transliteration: "Ketakaki Tamashii, Kurenai ni Moeyu" (Japanese: 気高き魂、紅に燃ゆ) | October 26, 2010 | August 20, 2013 |
| 17 | "Natsumi and Lord Senba"; Transliteration: "Natsumi to Senba-sama" (Japanese: 夏実と千羽様) | November 2, 2010 | August 20, 2013 |
| 18 | "The Evil Dog Howls at the Ruins"; Transliteration: "Kyōken, Haikyo ni Hōkōsu" (Japanese: 凶犬、廃墟に咆哮す) | November 9, 2010 | August 20, 2013 |
| 19 | "The Curtain Falls in the Darkness"; Transliteration: "Maku wa Yami Yori Hiraku" (Japanese: 幕は闇より開く) | November 16, 2010 | August 20, 2013 |
| 20 | "The 7:3 Pledge of Loyalty"; Transliteration: "Shichibun Sanbun no Sakazuki" (Japanese: 七分三分の盃) | November 23, 2010 | August 20, 2013 |
| 21 | "Towards the Sunrise"; Transliteration: "Akatsuki ni" (Japanese: 暁に) | November 30, 2010 | March 02, 2013 |
| 22 | "Darkness and Ice"; Transliteration: "Yami to Kōri" (Japanese: 闇と氷) | December 7, 2010 | March 09, 2013 |
| 23 | "The Devil's Blade"; Transliteration: "Maō no Kozuchi" (Japanese: 魔王の小槌) | December 14, 2010 | March 16, 2013 |
| 24 | "The Moon Is in the Sky"; Transliteration: "Tsuki wa Sora ni Aru" (Japanese: 月は空にある) | December 21, 2010 | March 23, 2013 |
| 24.5 | "The Afterglow of Youth"; Transliteration: "Shōnen Tachi no Zanshō" (Japanese: 少年たちの残照) | December 28, 2010 | March 30, 2013 |

=== Nura: Rise of the Yokai Clan – Demon Capital (2011) ===
| No. overall | No. in season | Title | Original airdate | English airdate |
|---|---|---|---|---|
| 25 | 1 | "The Nura Clan's Third Heir Awakens"; Transliteration: "Kakusei, Nura-gumi Sandaime" (Japanese: 覚醒、奴良組三代目) | July 5, 2011 | January 28, 2014 |
| 26 | 2 | "Two Justice"; Transliteration: "Futari no Seigi" (Japanese: 二人の正義) | July 12, 2011 | January 28, 2014 |
| 27 | 3 | "Yura's Realization"; Transliteration: "Keikain Yura no Nattoku" (Japanese: 花開院ゆらの納得) | July 19, 2011 | January 28, 2014 |
| 28 | 4 | "Nurarihyon and Princess Yo"; Transliteration: "Nurarihyon to Yōhime" (Japanese: ぬらりひょんと珱姫) | July 26, 2011 | January 28, 2014 |
| 29 | 5 | "Towards Today"; Transliteration: "Ima e to Tsunagu" (Japanese: 今へと繋ぐ) | August 2, 2011 | January 28, 2014 |
| 30 | 6 | "The Legends of Tono"; Transliteration: "Tōno Monogatari" (Japanese: 遠野・物語) | August 9, 2011 | January 28, 2014 |
| 31 | 7 | "Kyokasuigetsu"; Transliteration: "Kyōkasuigetsu" (Japanese: 鏡花水月) | August 16, 2011 | January 28, 2014 |
| 32 | 8 | "Hagoromo-Gitsune Kyoto Invasion"; Transliteration: "Hagoromo Gitsune Kyōto Zenmetsu Shinkō" (Japanese: 羽衣狐京都全滅侵攻) | August 23, 2011 | January 28, 2014 |
| 33 | 9 | "The Grey Onmyoji"; Transliteration: "Haiiro no Onmyōji" (Japanese: 灰色の陰陽師) | August 30, 2011 | January 28, 2014 |
| 34 | 10 | "Hagun"; Transliteration: "Hagun" (Japanese: 破軍) | September 6, 2011 | January 28, 2014 |
| 35 | 11 | "Battle Above Kyoto"; Transliteration: "Kyō Jōkū no Tatakai" (Japanese: 京上空の戦い) | September 13, 2011 | January 28, 2014 |
| 36 | 12 | "Long-Standing Wish"; Transliteration: "Shukugan" (Japanese: 宿願) | September 20, 2011 | January 28, 2014 |
| 36.5 | 12.5 | "The Destiny of the Demon Capital"; Transliteration: "Innen no Sennen Makyō" (Japanese: 因縁の千年魔京) | September 27, 2011 | January 28, 2014 |
| 37 | 13 | "Torii Labyrinth"; Transliteration: "Meikyū: Torii no Mori" (Japanese: 迷宮・鳥居の森) | October 4, 2011 | January 28, 2014 |
| 38 | 14 | "An Ayakashi to Avoid"; Transliteration: "Zettai ni Sōgū Shite wa Naranai Ayakashi" (Japanese: 絶対に遭遇してはならない妖) | October 11, 2011 | May 20, 2014 |
| 39 | 15 | "Descent Into Darkness..."; Transliteration: "Yami ni Shizumu..." (Japanese: 闇に沈む…) | October 18, 2011 | May 20, 2014 |
| 40 | 16 | "Shared Past"; Transliteration: "Futari no Kako" (Japanese: 二人の過去) | October 25, 2011 | May 20, 2014 |
| 41 | 17 | "Equipping a Hundred Demons"; Transliteration: "Hyakki Matou Miwaza" (Japanese: 百鬼纏う御業) | November 1, 2011 | May 20, 2014 |
| 42 | 18 | "Entrust It All to Me"; Transliteration: "Zenbu Azukero" (Japanese: 全部あずけろ) | November 8, 2011 | May 20, 2014 |
| 43 | 19 | "A Bond of Trust"; Transliteration: "Senaka-goshi no Kizuna" (Japanese: 背中越しの絆) | November 15, 2011 | May 20, 2014 |
| 44 | 20 | "The Cycle of Rebirth"; Transliteration: "Rin'ne no Wa" (Japanese: 輪廻の環) | November 22, 2011 | May 20, 2014 |
| 45 | 21 | "Birth"; Transliteration: "Tanjō" (Japanese: 誕生) | November 29, 2011 | May 20, 2014 |
| 46 | 22 | "Fragments of the Past"; Transliteration: "Tsuioku no Kakera" (Japanese: 追憶の欠片) | December 6, 2011 | May 20, 2014 |
| 47 | 23 | "Banquet of Darkness"; Transliteration: "Ankoku no Utage" (Japanese: 暗黒の宴) | December 13, 2011 | May 20, 2014 |
| 48 | 24 | "Rikuo’s Declaration"; Transliteration: "Rikuo, Sengensu" (Japanese: リクオ、宣言す) | December 20, 2011 | May 20, 2014 |
| 48.5 | 24.5 | "The Fate of the Demon Capital"; Transliteration: "Kenkon no Sennen Makyō" (Japanese: 乾坤の千年魔京) | December 27, 2011 | May 20, 2014 |

=== Special ===
On October 23, 2010 (after episode 17 and before episode 18), a 13-minute-long special episode entitled ぬらりひょんの孫 ～激闘 大フットサル大会！奴良組Wカップ!!～ (Nurarihyon no Mago: Gekitou Dai Futtosaru Taikai! Nuragumi W Cup!!) was shown at Jump Super Anime Tour 2010. It was later included in the Blu-ray release of season 1.
