= Belly of the Beast (restaurant) =

Mexican restaurant in Spring, Texas, U.S.

- Interactive map of Belly of the Beast

Restaurant information
- Food type: Mexican
- Location: Spring, Texas, United States
- Coordinates: 30.0744°N 95.4982°W
- Website: www.botbfood.com

Belly of the Beast is a Mexican restaurant in Spring, Texas, United States. It received Bib Gourmand status in the Michelin Guide in 2024. Thomas Bille was a semi-finalist in the Best Chef: Texas category of the James Beard Foundation Awards.

== See also ==
- List of Mexican restaurants
- List of Michelin-starred restaurants in Texas
