= Until I Have You =

2016 video game

- Developer: Wormwood Studios
- Publisher: Digital Tribe
- Composer: James Spanos
- Engine: Adventure Game Studio
- Platforms: Microsoft Windows, Linux
- Release: WW: 4 April 2016
- Genres: Side-scrolling, action, platform
- Mode: Single-player

Until I Have You is a side-scrolling action platform video game created by James Spanos and Andrea Ferrara and developed by Wormwood Studios. The game was published by Digital Tribe and released on Steam for Microsoft Windows and Linux on April 4, 2016. It was nominated for 9 AGS Awards and won 3, including that of Best Gameplay. Since its release, it has been met with mostly positive reviews. Reviewers praised the story, gameplay and voice-acting, while noting the steep difficulty level an apparent problem.

== Gameplay ==
Until I Have You is a 2D side-scrolling action platform video game which has 12 chapters with 4 stages and a unique boss each, taking place within a different setting. The goal for each stage is to get to the end of the stage as fast as possible without falling, getting killed or depleting your sanity gauge.

Central to Until I Have You is the exoskeleton suit. The suit gives the player special abilities at the cost of the player's sanity. The exoskeleton comes with the abilities to slow down time, ala Max Payne and to rewind time. However, overuse of these abilities will cause the sanity bar to deplete making your character lose touch with reality. When the sanity bar depletes your character starts to hallucinate, altering gameplay mechanics and level design.

In each stage, the player navigates his way from left to right through platforming sections, death traps, and enemies. The goal is to do this as fast as possible with the fewest deaths. The fast pace of the game can make it difficult to plan a perfect approach. To make up for this, the game allows the player to restart each stage the moment they die, allowing them to quickly fine-tune their approach over several attempts. At the end of each chapter the player must also defeat a unique boss. Along the way the player acquires a number of weapons and upgrades that you can cycle through, all of which have a specific use.

The game grades the player's performance at the end of each stage based on a number of factors and given a percentage rating out of 100. Things you get judged on include method of death, whether you kill any of the enemies and what you killed them with.

== Voice cast ==
The main protagonist The Artist is voiced by Kieran Flitton and the primary antagonist, Keiroth is voiced by actor Vincent van Ommen.

Another character includes the Newscaster, voiced by Marissa Lenti (One Piece, Attack on Titan), a broadcaster who provides information about story and insights into the world.

== Soundtrack ==
The Until I Have You - Official Soundtrack is an atmospheric synthesizer driven soundtrack created by James Spanos. It is freely available on Valve's digital distribution platform, Steam, as downloadable content for the main game. The soundtrack contains 34 tracks, available in both MP3 and FLAC format. James Spanos mentioned that Lazerhawk, Hans Zimmer's Interstellar, Miami Nights, Garth Knight, and Tangerine Dream have been the main influences for the soundtrack.

| No. | Title | Composer | Length |
|---|---|---|---|
| 1. | "Neokobe 2077" | James Spanos | 2:30 |
| 2. | "No Stopping Now" | James Spanos | 2:21 |
| 3. | "Electric Ghosts" | James Spanos | 5:26 |
| 4. | "Until I Have You" | James Spanos | 2:42 |
| 5. | "Hunter" | James Spanos | 3:24 |
| 6. | "Ride" | James Spanos | 4:30 |
| 7. | "Gaze" | James Spanos | 1:52 |
| 8. | "Life" | James Spanos | 1:52 |
| 9. | "Neon Blues" | James Spanos | 3:41 |
| 10. | "Night Raider" | James Spanos | 2:07 |
| 11. | "Not Enough" | James Spanos | 1:55 |
| 12. | "Revelations" | James Spanos | 2:36 |
| 13. | "Unstoppable" | James Spanos | 2:09 |
| 14. | "No Looks Could Kill" | James Spanos | 3:14 |
| 15. | "Roads" | James Spanos | 3:07 |
| 16. | "Selection" | James Spanos | 2:07 |
| 17. | "Pow" | James Spanos | 2:52 |
| 18. | "Circus Showdown" | James Spanos | 2:10 |
| 19. | "Colors" | James Spanos | 2:52 |
| 20. | "Peace" | James Spanos | 3:56 |
| 21. | "Nina's Theme" | James Spanos | 3:05 |
| 22. | "Freelance" | James Spanos | 3:00 |
| 23. | "Miami Night's 87" | James Spanos | 3:06 |
| 24. | "Circus Showdown (Slow)" | James Spanos | 2:35 |
| 25. | "Hysteria 101" | James Spanos | 1:36 |
| 26. | "Belly of The Beast" | James Spanos | 2:07 |
| 27. | "Belly of The Beast (Slow)" | James Spanos | 2:034 |
| 28. | "Inside The Van" | James Spanos | 2:31 |
| 29. | "Run" | James Spanos | 1:42 |
| Total length: | | | 1:36:08 |

== Reception ==
Until I Have You

Review scores
| Publication | Score |
|---|---|
| RageQuit | 74/100 |
| LaunchPartyGaming | 8.0/10 |
| OperationRainFall | 3.5/5 stars |
| Hooked Gamers | 6.0/10 |
| Hardcore Gamer | 3/5 stars |

Until I Have You received mostly positive reviews from critics, with praise given to its cyberpunk-style depiction of the game, its solid voice-acting and nuanced story. The game's synth-driven soundtrack was lauded for accentuating the already bleak and retro atmosphere. In 2017, Until I Have You was nominated in for 9 AGS Awards, including Best Game Created with AGS, Best Gameplay, Best Music and Best Voice Acting.

Rock, Paper, Shotgun's reviewer wrote "The parallax scrolling, great art and the 2D effects, the moving platforms, bosses and a particularly enjoyable selection of enemies should at the very least inspire you to give Until I Have You a try."

Hardcore Gamer gave the Until I Have You a 3/5, commenting that the graphics and music perfectly captured the classic cyberpunk feel, and praising how the games manages to keep each new level feeling different. The website's review also gave very high marks to the story and gameplay.

OperationRainFall awarded it 3.5 out of 5, specifically praising the voice-acting, saying "The voice-overs for the characters are also well done to the point where I consider them better than most dubs in localized Japanese titles and it is also clear that there was effort put into them to match the atmosphere of the game."

Hookedgamers praised about Until I Have You's story, design and voice-acting, and particularly noted the style: "There is a consistent bleak retro cyberpunk feel throughout the game, but it never becomes boring". The reviewer also noted the, at times, high difficulty level of game. Saying it can be frustrating for the players, ultimately giving it a 6/10.

== Awards ==
In 2016 the game received nine AGS Awards nominations. And won three AGS Awards in the categories Best Gameplay, Best Programming and Best Non Adventure Game Created with AGS.
