= The Titan's Bride =

Japanese manga and anime series by Itkz

- Cover to the first volume of the manga series.

巨人族の花嫁 (Kyojinzoku no Hanayome)
- Genre: Isekai, boys' love
- Manga
- Written by: Itkz
- Published by: Suiseisha
- English publisher: NA: Coolmic (digital) Seven Seas Entertainment (print)
- Imprint: Glanz BL Comics
- Magazine: Screamo
- Original run: March 28, 2019 – present
- Volumes: 10
- Anime television series
- Directed by: Rei Ishikura
- Written by: Eeyo Kurosaki
- Music by: Toshinori Kawamura
- Studio: Studio Hōkiboshi
- Licensed by: NA: Coolmic; NA: Ascendent Animation
- Original network: ComicFesta Anime (Premium); Tokyo MX, YouTube, Niconico (Standard)
- Original run: July 6, 2020 – August 31, 2020
- Episodes: 9

The Titan's Bride (Japanese: 巨人族の花嫁, Hepburn: Kyojinzoku no Hanayome) is a Japanese manga series written and illustrated by the artist Itkz. It has been serialized in the web manga magazine Screamo since 2019, and has been collected into ten tankōbon volumes by Suiseisha so far. The series follows the relationship between Kōichi Mizuki, a human student, and Caius Lao Bistail, a giant prince who summons Kōichi to his world.

The series was adapted into a television anime series by Studio Hōkiboshi and Comet Company in 2020. Episodes stream on the digital distribution platform ComicFesta Anime; versions of each episode that are edited to remove sexually explicit content broadcast on Tokyo MX, and stream on YouTube and Niconico. English-language translations of both the manga and anime are syndicated by the digital distribution platform Coolmic, which simulcast the anime series during its original broadcast run.

On January 25, 2021, it was announced the anime will receive an anime dub produced by Ascendent Animation.

== Synopsis ==
High school basketball player Kōichi Mizuki is suddenly summoned to a world populated by giants. He is met by Caius Lao Bistail, the prince of the world, who immediately asks Kōichi to marry him.

== Characters ==
Kōichi Mizuki (水樹 晃一)
Voiced by: Kent Itō (Japanese); Edward A. Mendoza (English)
A high school basketball player who is suddenly summoned to Tildant, a world populated by giants and other mythological creatures.
Caius Lao Bistail (カイウス・ラオ・ビステイル)
Voiced by: Yūki Ono (Japanese); Kiba Walker (English)
The prince of Tildant, who asks Kōichi to be his bride.
Medina Nall Rosas (メディナ・ナル・ローザス)
Voiced by: Noriko Fujimoto (Japanese); Angela Tran (English)
Caius's former fiancée.
Baro Barows (バロ・バロウズ)
Voiced by: Masatomo Nakazawa (Japanese); Kdin Jenzen (English)
An anthropomorphic wolf and drifter.
Beri Berinal (ベリ・ベリナル)
Voiced by: Yusuke Shirai (Japanese); Patrick M. Seymour (English)
An anthropomorphic tiger and tradesman.

== Media ==
=== Manga ===
The Titan's Bride is written and illustrated by Itkz. It has been serialized as a digital comic by publisher Suieseisha under their Screamo label since 2019, and is published as collected tankōbon volumes under their Glanz BL Comics imprint. An English-language translation of the series is published by the digital distribution platform Coolmic. The series is published in print in English by Seven Seas Entertainment since 2022. Seven Seas Entertainment states that the print editions "will feature the completely uncensored original art not available in other editions." As of October 2024, Seven Seas have published Volumes 1 to 5 of The Titan's Bride, with Volume 6 being released on January 14, 2025.

| No. | Original release date | Original ISBN | English release date | English ISBN |
|---|---|---|---|---|
| 1 | March 18, 2020 | 978-4-434-26839-7 (Regular); 978-4-434-26840-3 (Limited) | October 18, 2022 | 978-1-63858-810-8 |
| 2 | July 17, 2020 | 978-4-434-27565-4 | January 3, 2023 | 978-1-68579-331-9 |
| 3 | May 18, 2021 | 978-4-434-28586-8 (Regular); 978-4-434-28587-5 (Special) | May 2, 2023 | 978-1-68579-532-0 |
| 4 | May 18, 2022 | 978-4-434-30030-1 (Regular); 978-4-434-30031-8 (Special) | July 30, 2024 | 979-8-88843-008-8 |
| 5 | March 18, 2023 | 978-4-434-31378-3 (Regular) | October 15, 2024 | 979-8-88843-105-4 |
| 6 | December 18, 2023 | 978-4-434-32690-5 | January 14, 2025 | 979-8-89160-668-5 |
| 7 | August 16, 2024 | 978-4-434-33960-8 | July 15, 2025 | 979-8-89373-334-1 |
| 8 | February 18, 2025 | 978-4-434-34918-8 | January 27, 2026 | — |
| 9 | August 18, 2025 | 978-4-434-35856-2 | July 21, 2026 | — |
| 10 | March 18, 2026 | 978-4-434-35856-2 | | |

=== Anime ===
On March 18, 2020, The Titan's Bride publisher Suiseisha announced that the series would be adapted into a television anime series. The series is produced by Studio Hōkiboshi and Comet Company, with the primary production staff composed of Rei Ishikura as director, Eeyo Kurosaki as scriptwriter, and Shinichi Yoshikawa as both character designer and chief animation director. The Titan's Bride stars Kento Itō as the voice of Kōichi and Yūki Ono as the voice of Caius, who also perform the series' theme song. The first trailer for the series was released on June 19, 2020.

The series premiered on July 5, 2020. Two versions of each episode are produced: a "premium edition" that airs on the digital distribution platform ComicFesta Anime, which includes sexually explicit content, and an edited version that airs on Tokyo MX, YouTube, and Niconico which removes sexually explicit content. In English-language markets, the series is licensed by the digital distribution platform Coolmic.

| No. | Title | Original air date |
|---|---|---|
| 1 | "Bride Summons" (Japanese: 花嫁の召喚) | July 5, 2020 |
After winning a basketball tournament, Kōichi Mizuki is magically summoned by Prince Caius Lao Bistail to Tildant, a world ruled by titans. Caius declares that Kōichi is his bride, and initiates sex with him.
| 2 | "Tragedy Prince" (Japanese: 悲劇の王子) | July 12, 2020 |
A flashback reveals how a prophecy decreed that Caius could never wed someone from his own world, which prompted his decision to summon Kōichi.
| 3 | "A Titan's Desire" (Japanese: 巨人族の本懐) | July 19, 2020 |
Kōichi agrees to stay with Caius for a period of one month; in exchange, Caius agrees to not do anything to Kōichi against his will, and to return Kōichi to his home world after the month has concluded. Caius explains to Kōichi how titan society is open about sex and sexuality, and they engage in frottage in a public garden.
| 4 | "After the Feast" (Japanese: 宴の後で) | July 19, 2020 |
Caius' former fiancée arrives at the party with a mysterious smile, hinting at undisclosed intentions. Meanwhile, Koichi begins to develop special feelings for Caius, leading to a potential shift in their relationship dynamics. This development raises the question of whether the emotional distance between Koichi and Caius is beginning to change.
| 5 | "The Country of Beasts" (Japanese: 獣人の国) | July 19, 2020 |
Koichi falls ill, and the only cure is a rare fruit that grows exclusively in the Country of Beasts. Caius decides to embark on a journey to find this fruit, but Koichi insists on accompanying him. Together, they venture into the mysterious Country of Beasts, known as Fobal. What challenges and discoveries await them in this uncharted territory?
| 6 | "Trading Style" (Japanese: 取引の流儀) | July 19, 2020 |
As Koichi's condition deteriorates, he and Caius desperately seek the elusive raisa fruit. During their quest, they encounter two beastmen named Bery and Baro, who propose a deal. This raises questions about whether their offer will save Koichi and what Bery and Baro's true intentions might be.
| 7 | "The Night of Disaster" (Japanese: 厄災の夜) | July 19, 2020 |
While Caius accompanies Bery to make the trade, Koichi is kidnapped by Baro. Despite Koichi's cries for Caius, Bery and his men surround Caius, preventing him from coming to Koichi's aid. During this tense situation, Baro discovers that Koichi is in heat, adding another layer of urgency and complexity to their predicament.
| 8 | "Night of the Full Moon..." (Japanese: 満月の夜に……) | July 19, 2020 |
Just as Baro is about to take advantage of Koichi, who is in heat, Caius arrives to rescue him. After dealing with Baro, Caius explains Koichi's condition and commands Baro to retrieve the raisa fruit. As they wait, Caius attempts to calm Koichi. The question remains: will Baro succeed in saving Koichi?
| 9 | "To Vow Love at the Center of the World" (Japanese: 世界の中心で愛を誓ったものたち) | July 19, 2020 |
Since arriving at Tildant, Koichi has met many people, faced numerous challenges, and learned new things, all with Caius by his side. As Koichi begins to lose consciousness, he utters a significant message to Caius. The urgency heightens as they await Baro's return with the raisa fruit. The story of the bride of a titan reaches its dramatic climax.

=== Other media ===
An audio drama CD was included with the first tankōbon volume of the manga series, featuring Itō and Ono as Kōichi and Caius, respectively.

A The Titan's Bride web radio series premiered on ComicFesta Radio on July 10, 2020. Episodes were released twice-weekly, and featured interviews with the series' voice cast.
