= 3-11 Porter =

Norwegian musical group

3–11 Porter
- Origin: Norway
- Years active: 2000–present
- Labels: Nordic Records, Who Went Where Records, Stereo Deluxe, Edge Records, Drizzly Records
- Members: Per Arne Bertheussen; Tracee Meyn; Svein Hansen
- Website: www.3-11porter.com

3-11 Porter is a Norwegian group formed in 2000.

3-11 Porter has broken free from the traditional pop sound and added their own spice to music, with their mix of pop, rock, jazz, Latin and electronica, combined with their cinematic approach to the lyrics and the arrangements. All of these elements define 3-11 Porter's sound.

== History ==
Singer and songwriter Per Arne Bertheussen made a demo of a song in 1997. Edge Records released a very limited pressing of 200 copies under the band name: "Porter" and the song "I Can’t Forget The Girl I Never Met" on purple vinyl.

In 2000, Per Arne Bertheussen met Svein Hansen and a whole new era began. Per Arne and Svein were joined by Tracee Meyn, a Norway-based American singer, and the trio subsequently recorded a total of 20 songs in the next two months, with Per Arne writing and Svein arranging the music. Some of these recordings were later featured on their debut album Nurse Me. Per Arne, Svein and Tracee have varying musical backgrounds. While Per Arne's influences are strongly from Electronica and new wave genres, Svein, a musician, producer and skilled composer has classical, jazz and international folk music influences and Tracee's background is gospel and soul.

3–11 Porter was signed by Nordic Records following a concert at Oslo's Café Mono in 2003, the signing led to the international release of Nurse Me.

A remix of "Surround Me With Your Love", by Per Martinsen (Mental Overdrive), was included on the Tea Lounge compilation album in Norway, the first of more than 200 compilation albums on which this song appears.

The band's international breakthrough came in September 2003 when the remix of "Surround Me With Your Love" was included on Hôtel Costes Vol. 6. It proved so popular that it was also included on the Best of Hôtel Costes and the Hôtel Costes box set.

Ragnvald Åheim joined the band to play bass later that year, and in 2004, Kristian Hilden joined to play drums.

In 2004, German record company Drizzly Records released a rare 12" vinyl containing seven remixes of "Surround Me With Your Love". The cosmetic firm Rimmel used the remix "Surround Me With Your Love" in a 2005 commercial starring Kate Moss, which was shown in 63 countries. "Surround Me With Your Love", the original song and the remix, has also been used by many international TV companies worldwide, including the BBC, TV Globo (Brazil), TV2 Norway, Discovery Channel and Animal Planet. The German label Stereo Deluxe signed 3–11 Porter in 2007 and released their second album, Surround Me, in 2008. Guest performers on the album Surround Me included David M on "Sunglasses", "There Is A Place Where I Go" and "The Sleep That I’ll Bring You"; Helge Kvam on marimba on "The Mood of the Scene"; Ole Jørn Myklebust on trumpet on "On A Dead Sunday Afternoon", "Vintage" and "Sunglasses"; Javid Afsari Rad on santour on "The Loneliest Night on Earth"; Pejman Hadadi on percussion on "The Loneliest Night on Earth"; Vida Afsari Rad on "The Loneliest Night on Earth"; Maud Forsgren on "The Loneliest Night on Earth"; and Cristina Latini on "The Loneliest Night on Earth".

In 2008, the original song "Surround Me With Your Love" appeared on the soundtrack of the German language version of the movie Fireflies in the Garden starring Julia Roberts, Willem Dafoe, and Emily Watson. The song was used to promote the film on radio and TV commercials in German speaking countries. In the same year, British ITV used both the original song and the remix of "Surround Me With Your Love" for their teen drama series Echo Beach.

In 2009, the original song "Surround Me With Your Love" was used as the main theme song for one of the leading characters on the Brazilian soap opera Viver a Vida. Viver a Vida has been shown in many countries including Portugal and USA. Because of this, the album Surround Me was also released in Brazil.

In 2011, MTV chose three songs, "Surround Me With Your Love" (the original version), "Nightlife" and "I Can’t Forget The Girl I Never Met", for their series Popland. In 2012, 3–11 Porter re-signed with Nordic Records and their new album Electric Velvetwas released in September 2014. The album's first single "Belly of the Beast" was released in May 2013 and was followed by a video.

Other 3–11 Porter songs which have been included on numerous international compilation albums are "On A Dead Sunday Afternoon", "Praying", "The Loneliest Night on Earth", "I Can’t Forget The Girl I Never Met", "Longing", "Nightlife", "Vintage" and "Where Love’s Never Been".

== Discography ==
=== Singles ===
- "I Can't Forget The Girl I Never Met" (Edge Records)
- "The Host" / "Nightlife" (Nordic Records)
- "Surround Me With Your Love" (Nordic Records, Drizzly Records)
- "Lovetrain" (Nordic Records)
- "Praying" (Stereo Deluxe)
- "Luck Is Around The Corner" (Who Went Where Records)
- "Belly of the Beast" (Nordic Records)
- "Waiting for You " (Nordic Records )
- "The Ugly Thing" (Nordic Records )
- "Noen Venter" (Who Went Where Records)
- "Complete and Lovely" (Who Went Where Records)
- "Waiting For You" (Who Went Where Records)
- "Where The Wind Blows" (Who Went Where Records)

=== Albums ===
- Nurse Me (Nordic Records 2003)
- Surround Me (Stereo Deluxe 2008)
- Electric Velvet (Who Went Where Records 2014)

=== Compilations ===
- Tea Lounge (2003)
- Hôtel Costes vol 6 (2003)
- Hôtel Costes Best of 2007
- Hôtel Costes Box (2009)

== Members ==
- Per Arne Bertheussen: Vocal and Keyboard
- Svein Hansen: Guitars and Flutes
- Tracee Meyn: Vocal

Additional live musicians

- Ragnvald Åheim: Bass
- Per Kristian Hilden: Drums
- Per Nordengen: Keyboard
