= Darrel Guilbeau =

American voice actor

- Guilbeau in 2008
- Occupation: Voice actor
- Years active: 1984–present

Darrel Guilbeau is an American voice actor. He began working on voice acting in anime roles, when his friends asked him to audition for Overman King Gainer and he won the title role, Gainer Sanga. Guilbeau is also known as the voice of Mikado Ryugamine from Durarara!!, the title character of Nura: Rise of the Yokai Clan, Rikuo Nura; Hakuryu Ren from the Magi series, and Amaimon from the Blue Exorcist series. He has reprised his roles as Mikado and Rikuo in Durarara!!×2 and Nura: Rise of the Yokai Clan - Demon Capital, respectively.

== Filmography ==
=== Anime ===
List of dubbing performances in anime
Year	Title	Role	Notes	Source
2005	Overman King Gainer	Gainer Sanga		
2011	Durarara!!	Mikado Ryugamine		
2011	Durarara!!×2	Mikado Ryugamine		
2012	Blue Exorcist	Amaimon	Including Movie	
2012	Nura: Rise of the Yokai Clan	Rikuo Nura	Season 1	
2012	Nura: Rise of the Yokai Clan - Demon Capital	Rikuo Nura	Season 2	
2013	Magi: The Labyrinth of Magic	Hakuryuu Ren	Season 1 & 2	

=== Video games ===
List of dubbing performances in video games
Year	Title	Role	Source
2007	Warriors Orochi	Nagamasa Azai, Mitsuhide Akechi	
2008	Culdcept Saga	Main Ceptor	
2008	Dynasty Warriors 6	Taishi Ci	
2008	Warriors Orochi 2	Nagamasa Azai, Mitsuhide Akechi	
2009	Valkyrie Profile: Covenant of the Plume	Wylfred	
2009	Final Fantasy Crystal Chronicles: The Crystal Bearers	Layle	
2011	Marvel vs. Capcom 3: Fate of Two Worlds	Viewtiful Joe	
2013	Dynasty Warriors 8	Yue Jin, Xu Shu	
