= Marissa Lenti =

American voice actor (born 1992)

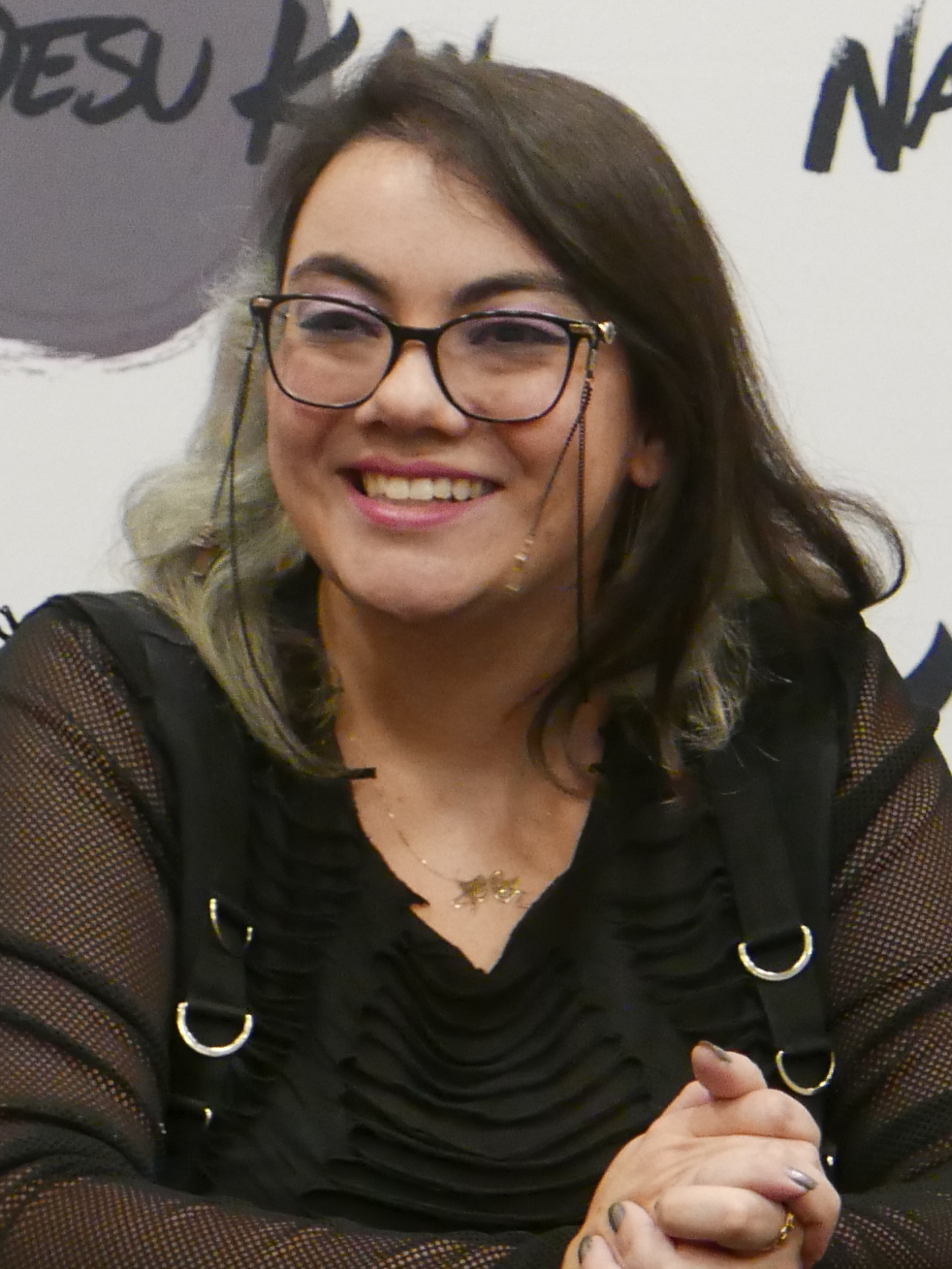
- Lenti at Nan Desu Kan in 2024
- Born: September 18, 1992 (age 34); Queens, New York, U.S.
- Other name: Vixen the Reindeer
- Occupations: Voice actress; ADR director; writer; VTuber
- Years active: 2014–present

Twitch information
- Channel: Vixen_VTuber
- Years active: 2023–present
- Genre: Gaming
- Followers: 23.9 thousand

YouTube information
- Channel: Vixen the Reindeer
- Years active: 2023–present
- Genres: Reaction; Gaming
- Subscribers: 324 thousand
- Views: 37.6 million
- Last updated: July 18, 2026
- Website: marissalenti.com

Marissa Lenti (born September 18, 1992), also known online as Vixen the Reindeer, is an American voice actor, ADR director, writer, and VTuber. Some of Lenti's notable roles include Yuna in Kuma Kuma Kuma Bear, Shoko Majima in Kokkoku, Chiaki Hoshinomori in Gamers!, Alicia Florence in Aria the Animation, Nita in Brawl Stars, Financier Cookie in Cookie Run: Kingdom, and Gangle in The Amazing Digital Circus.

== Biography ==
Lenti began performing in theatre at the age of 8 and started taking on-camera roles around age 12. They (Note: Lenti uses both she/her and they/them pronouns. This article uses they/them for consistency.) later accumulated over a decade of experience as a seamstress, at one point running a business creating costumes and dolls. While studying costume design in college, they decided to pursue voice acting instead. To support this career change, they used savings from their business to relocate from Boston to Texas.

While in Dallas, Lenti attended Haberkon, a convention hosted by voice actor Todd Haberkorn, where they met ADR director Tyler Walker of Funimation. Walker subsequently cast them in the English dub of Tokyo ESP, followed by their first named role as Libra in Fairy Tail. Their first main role was Chiaki Hoshinomori in Gamers!.

In May 2016, Lenti joined Sound Cadence Studios as an ADR director, as well as a writer and production assistant. During their time there, they have directed numerous series, including Kemono Friends, Kageki Shoujo!!, and Arte.

In May 2023, Lenti began streaming as a VTuber under the alter ego of Vixen, an anthropomorphic reindeer from the North Pole.

== Personal life ==
Lenti identifies as agender and asexual and uses she/they pronouns. They are of Italian, Irish, and MENA descent.

== Filmography ==
=== Anime series ===
List of voice performances in anime
Year	Title	Role	Notes	Source
2015	Fairy Tail	Libra	Replaced Krishna Smitha, episode 204+	
2015	One Piece	Mistress Sadie		
2015	Attack on Titan: Junior High	Ilse Langnar		
2016	Pandora in the Crimson Shell: Ghost Urn	Nurse Samantha		
2016	Nanbaka	Momoko Hyakushiki		
2016	Keijo!!!!!!!!	Atsuko Yoshida		
2016	ReLIFE	Sumire Inukai		
2016	Rio: Rainbow Gate!	Cartia Goldschmidt		
2017	Trickster	Fumiyo		
2017	The Silver Guardian	Collector, Nishikaze		
2017	In Another World with My Smartphone	Kohaku		
2017	Gamers!	Chiaki Hoshinomori	First main character	
2017	Dragon Ball Super	Cocotte		
2017	Kemono Friends	Gray Wolf	ADR Director, ADR Script Writer	
2018	How Not to Summon a Demon Lord	Celestine Baudelaire		
2018	Chio's School Road	Madoka		
2018	Aokana: Four Rhythm Across the Blue	Botan		
2018	Hells	Wolfie		
2018	Aria the Animation	Alicia Florence		
2018	Bloom Into You	Rei	ADR Script	
2019	Dragon Ball Super	Cocotte		
2019	Kokkoku	Shoko Majima		
2019	B't X	B't Shadow X, Teppei's mother		
2019	YU-NO: A Girl Who Chants Love at the Bound of this World	Keiko Arima		
2019	Nichijou	Yuuko's Mom		
2019	Cutie Honey Universe	Genet/Sister Jill		
2019	The Ones Within	Yuzu Roromori		
2019	Cautious Hero: The Hero Is Overpowered but Overly Cautious	Aria		
2019	Actors: Songs Connection	Black Cat	Assistant ADR Director, ADR Script Writer	
2019	No Guns Life	Olivier Vandeberme		
2019	Azur Lane	Z1, Atago		
2019	Black Clover	Risakka Ondell		
2020	To Love Ru	Mikado, Marron		
2020	Toilet-Bound Hanako-kun	Mermaid		
2020	Super HxEros	Kiseichuu X, Haruka, Mogana Iwazu, Minyarin		
2020	Assault Lily Bouquet	Soraha Amano		
2020	By the Grace of the Gods	Lulutia		
2020	Gleipnir	Nana's Mother		
2020	Arte	Darcia	ADR Director	
2020	Thermae Romae	Narrator	2012 series	
2021	Attack on Titan	Willy Tybur's Wife		
2021	Kuma Kuma Kuma Bear	Yuna	Lead role	
2021	Horimiya	Yuriko Hori		
2021	Adachi and Shimamura		ADR Director	
2021	Log Horizon: Destruction of the Round Table	Intix	Season 3, Replaced Kaytha Coker	
2021	Shachibato! President, It's Time for Battle!	Ruck		
2021	Sleepy Princess in the Demon Castle	Teddy Demons, Stamp Cat		
2021	The Titan's Bride	Baro's Mother		
2021	Kageki Shojo!!	Staff, Boys in Ai's Class, Food Stand Worker	ADR Director	
2021	Pokémon Evolutions	Malva	Episode 3	
2021	Mieruko-chan	Nyansuke, Kido	Assistant ADR Director	
2022	Kakegurui ××	Miroslava Honebami	Sentai Filmworks dub	
2022	Tribe Nine		ADR director	
2022	Girls' Frontline	Persica		
2022	A Couple of Cuckoos	Namie Umino	Assistant ADR Director	
2023	KonoSuba: An Explosion on This Wonderful World!	Arue		
2023	Pluto	Mine		
2026	The Darwin Incident	Lydia Eldred		

=== Animation ===
List of voice performances in Animation
Year	Title	Role	Notes	Source
2016–2017, 2019–present	RWBY	Joanna Greenleaf, Oscar's Aunt, Medium Boy		
2023–2026	The Amazing Digital Circus	Gangle, Martha Mildenhall		
2026	Baby Lamb and Friends	Ewenice Lamshankensteimer		

=== Films ===
List of voice performances in films
Year	Title	Role	Notes	Source
2020	Galaxy Express 999: Eternal Fantasy	Mii-kun		
2020	City Hunter: Shinjuku Private Eyes	Saeko Nogami	ADR script writer	
2021	KonoSuba: God's Blessing on this Wonderful World! Legend of Crimson	Arue		
2024	Digimon Adventure	Little Boy 1A	ADR Director, Script Reversioning, Production Coordinator, Producer	
2024	Digimon Adventure: Our War Game!	Toshiko Takenouchi, Grocery Girl, Little Girl 2B	ADR Director, Script Reversioning, Production Coordinator, Producer	
2024	Digimon Adventure 02: Digimon Hurricane Touchdown!! / Transcendent Evolution! The Golden Digimentals		ADR Director, Script Reversioning, Production Coordinator, Producer	

=== Video games ===
List of voice performances in video games
Year	Title	Role	Notes	Source
2014–2023	Yandere Simulator	Genka Kunahito, Mae Kunahito, Mida Rana		
2014	My Little Pony: Twilight's Kingdom	Princess Celestia, Princess Cadance		
2015	Transformers Rescue Bots: Dino Island	Frankie Greene, Professor Anna Baranova		
2015	Heroes of Newerth	Snow Queen Shiva, Hexa Silohuette, MadCat Madman, Mermaid Torturer, Big Top Benzi, Azure Dragon Sapphire		
2016	3on3 Freestyle	Ginger		
2016	Until I Have You	Newscaster		
2016	Anima: Gate of Memories	Elienai Griomorie		
2017	Boom Beach	Cryoneer, Sgt. Brick		
2017	Regalia: Of Men and Monarchs	Henrietta		
2017	A Hat in Time	Fire Spirits		
2017	Torment: Tides of Numenera	Matkina		
2017	Brawl Stars	Nita		
2019	My Time at Portia	Mali		
2019	Winds of Change	Nada		
2019	Borderlands 3	Moze	Main character	
2021, 2026	Cookie Run: Kingdom	Financier Cookie, Gangle Cookie		
2021, 2026	Cris Tales	Sophia		
2021, 2026	Class of '09	Nicole's Mom		
2022	Freedom Planet 2	Maria Notte		
2022	Path to Nowhere	Oak Casket, Dudu		
2023	Goddess of Victory: Nikke	Nihilister, Liberalio	Credited in-game	
2023	Class of '09: The Re-up	Nicole's Mom		
2024	Zenless Zone Zero	Pulchra Fellini		
2025	Octopath Traveler 0	Herminia		
2025	Digimon Story: Time Stranger	King Drasil, additional voices		
2026	BOOM! Buster	Bridget		

=== Music ===
List of voice performances in Music
Year	Title	Notes	Source
2024	Funny Things		
2025	Gangle's Puppet Boy		
2025	Do What I Say		
2025	Blue Christmas		
2026	Spudsy's Cherry Blossom Ice Tea		
2026	MASK (Gangle's Song)		
