= Michael Gluck =

American businessman (born 1983)

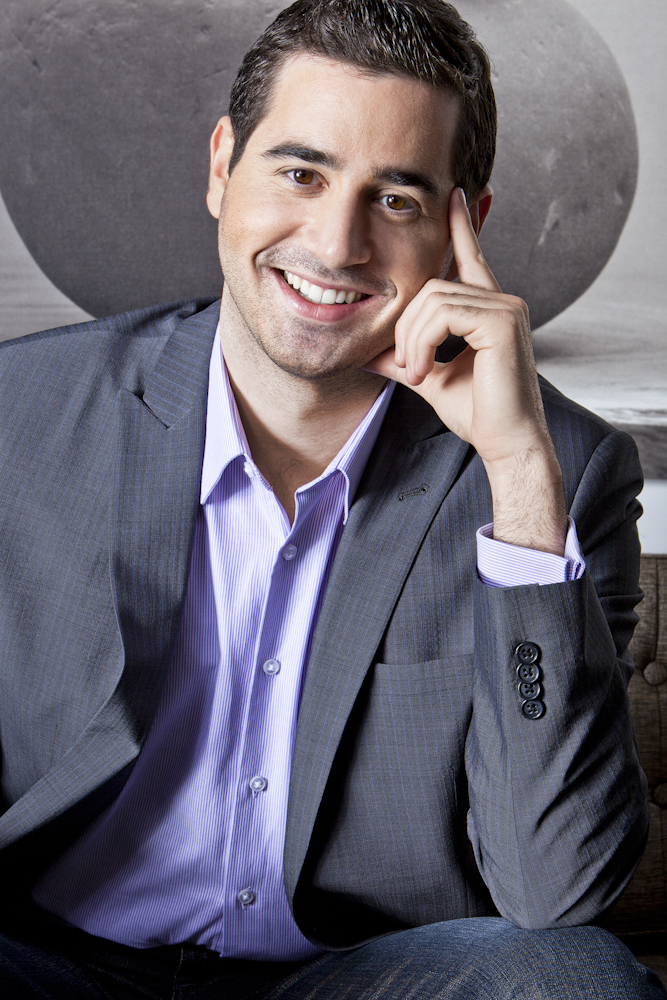
- Michael Gluck
- Born: March 8, 1983 (age 43); Miami, Florida
- Education: University of Pennsylvania
- Occupation: Founder of VGM

Michael Gluck (born March 8, 1983) is the founder of VGM, a market research firm and the largest provider of custom research to the video game industry.

== VGM ==
In 2007, at the age of 24, Gluck started VGM with $5,000 in savings and grew the company to $20,000,000 in lifetime sales by the age of 30. As of 2017, VGM had serviced more than 50 video game companies, as well as industry leaders in entertainment, media, and technology VGM launched VGMgo in August 2025, creating the best remote playtesting platform for developers and publishers of all sizes.

== Piano Squall ==
As a college student, Gluck performed piano concerts and released an album under the stage name "Piano Squall" to raise money for the National Multiple Sclerosis Society. The group supports research and treatment of multiple sclerosis, which Gluck's grandmother died from.

== Other ventures ==
In 2013, Gluck co-founded and produced a video game music band that is currently on tour in the United States, Australia, and the Middle East.

== Education ==
Gluck studied business at the University of Pennsylvania and graduated in the class of 2005.

== Personal life ==
Gluck was born in Miami, Florida. He enjoys piano, tennis, and chess.
