= Detmold (surname) =

Notable people with the family name Detmold include:

- Christian Edward Detmold (1810–1887), German-American engineer; younger brother of William Ludwig Detmold
- Edward Julius Detmold (1883–1957) and his twin brother, Charles Maurice Detmold (1883–1908), English illustrators
- Henry Detmold (1854–1924), English painter
- William Ludwig Detmold, (1808–1894), German-American orthopedic surgeon; older brother of Christian Edward Detmold
- William Detmold, (1828–1884), German-American-Australian bookbinder, printer and stationer

Nobility (House of Lippe)

- Frederick Adolphus, Count of Lippe-Detmold (1667–1718), father of Simon Henry Adolph
- Simon August, Count of Lippe-Detmold (1727–1782), son of Simon Henry Adolph
- Simon Henry Adolph, Count of Lippe-Detmold (1694–1734), son of Frederick Adolphus, father of Simon August
