= Lisa Furukawa =

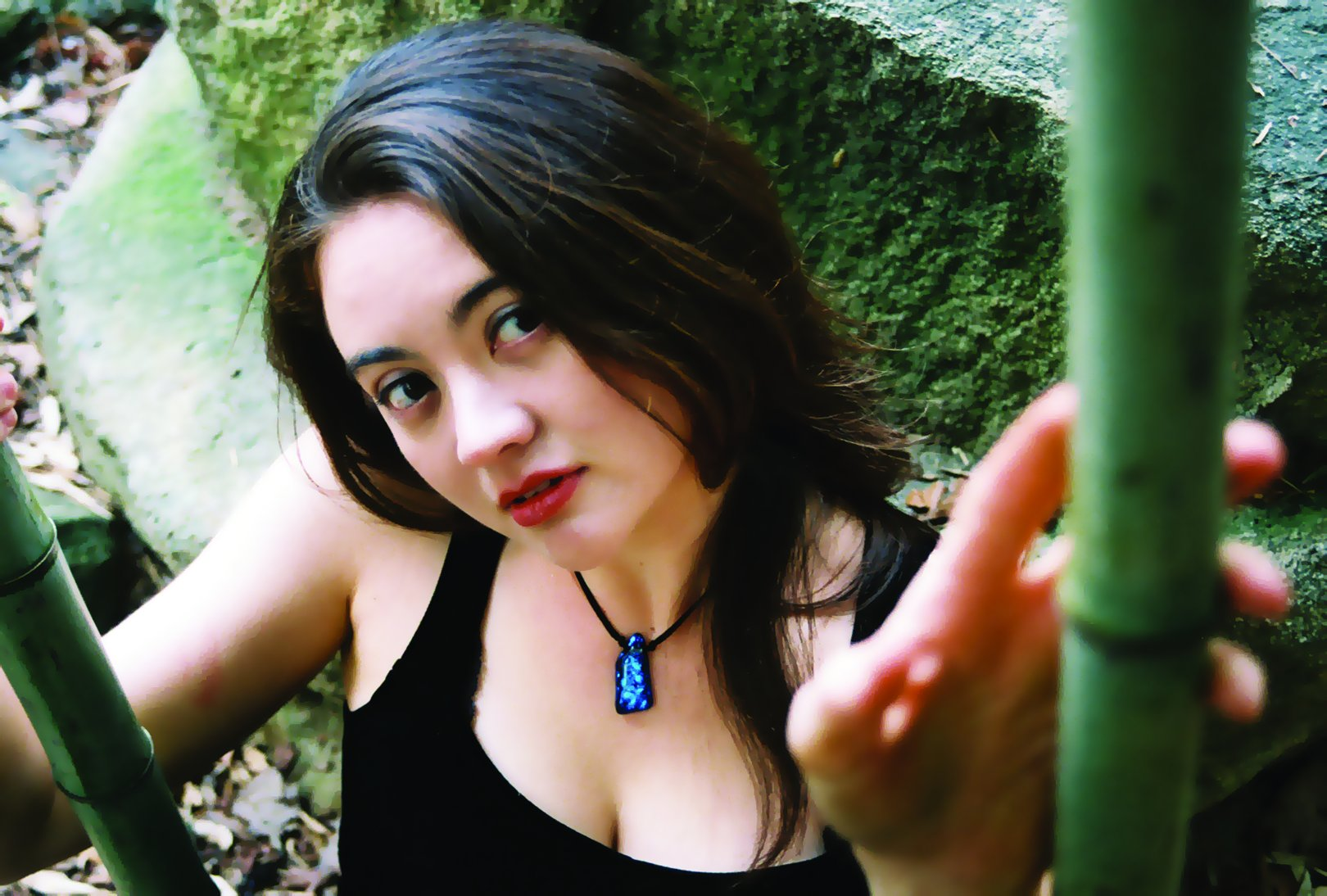
- Lisa Furukawa from the "Reaching the Dragon" album.

Background information
- Born: Lisa Furukawa; January 25, 1976 (age 50)
- Origin: Tokyo, Japan
- Genres: Indie folk, indie pop, chamber pop, shoegaze
- Instruments: Piano, vocals
- Years active: 2000–present
- Label: Yume
- Website: www.lisafurukawa.com

Lisa Furukawa (古川梨沙 Furukawa Risa, born January 25, 1976, Tokyo, Japan) is a Japanese American pianist, singer, arranger, and songwriter based in Durham, North Carolina. She has self-published 4 albums on the Yume label: Signal (2009), Reaching the Dragon (2006), Pearl Diver (2005), and This Moment is the Show (2001).

A fusion of folk, alternative chamber pop, and electronica, Furukawa's music combines soulful piano and vocal ballads that range in breadth from love songs to complex Celtic jigs, often imbued with mythical and historical themes.

Furukawa also recorded original songs in the Seattle-based band Cloudsang with guitarist and husband Leon Monroe (formerly of North Carolina–based bands "Doombunny" and "The Hurt") and drummer Phil Mauck (formerly of "The Hurt"). The band is inspired by eclectic tastes that range from indie bluegrass to classically influenced contemporary pop and jazz.

== Conventions ==
Since 2005, Furukawa has been primarily known for her work with cartoon and video game theme songs and touring Japanese animation and media conventions around the world. She began performing at events such as MTAC (the Middle Tennessee Anime Convention), Realmscon, Mechacon, Otakon, Anime Central, SAC-Anime. In the following years, she performed at over 50 conventions around the United States, Canada, New Zealand, and Australia (Armageddon Expo). Furukawa was the first anime guest at Dragon Con in Atlanta, Georgia, and has been invited to return year after year to many events. Her performances often surprise audiences with intricate original arrangements of music from series such as Ghost in the Shell, Cowboy Bebop, and Wolf's Rain. She has performed music composed by Yoko Kanno and Akira Yamaoka with vocalists such as Ilaria Graziano and Mary Elizabeth McGlynn. In addition to creating new arrangements of anime and video game theme songs, Furukawa is the first person to have translated almost all of the American state songs and foreign national anthems into Japanese. She also has translated many English children's songs into Japanese. As a translator, Furukawa helped to translate anime trailers and documentaries for Studio Ghibli.

== Notable performances ==
Furukawa has performed at Japan Fest, Japanese consulate functions, the Who's Who in Asian Americans Gala, ceilidhs in the Highlands of Scotland, and the National Association of Asian American Professionals national conference. Furukawa has directed multiple charity events and concerts to benefit the Asia Foundation, RAINN (the "Tori Amos Tribute Show"), and the American and Japanese Red Cross.

== Early influences and family ==
Originally from Tokyo, Japan, Furukawa grew up in Japan and America with a musical family and studied classical music from the age of 2. Her grandmother, Chizuko Furukawa, was a published lyricist and composer. Her grandfather, Haruo Furukawa 古川晴男, was an entomologist and author of books, such as the translation of Fabre insect series, which inspired Chizuko Furukawa's compositions about the small world of insects composed for NHK in Japan. Furukawa's father and uncle perform in several notable bluegrass, folk, country, and Hawaiian blues bands in Tokyo. Furukawa's Scottish-American mother was an avid classical, folk, and Scottish music fan, and encouraged Furukawa to begin writing songs from an early age.

== Early performance career ==
Furukawa is also a classical pianist and teacher. In her high school years, she was a Fletcher Scholarship winner, placed in many piano contests for solo and concerto performances (Durham Symphony, Yamaha, RPTA, MTNA), and participated in music festivals (Eastern Music Festival) and classical masterclasses. At UNC-Chapel Hill, she studied piano with Michael Zenge and Francis Whang, voice with Sharon Szymanski, and composition with Allen Anderson.

Furukawa began collaborating and performing with musician friends from UNC-Chapel Hill. Furukawa began performing her solo piano and vocal works in North Carolina.

== Albums ==
After receiving her degrees in Music and Asian studies from UNC-Chapel Hill, she recorded her first album of solo piano and vocal work, "This Moment is the Show" in 2001 at Coffeehouse Studios in Stockbrige, GA with engineer Brian Thompson. A trio was formed (composed of Furukawa on vocals and piano, John Metcalf on percussion, and Deborah Shields on cello) to perform and record "Pearl Diver" in 2005, Furukawa's second album of original songs inspired by Japanese history, folk myths, and ocean themes. In 2006, Furukawa composed and self-produced her third album, "Reaching the Dragon" which was musically inspired by her experience arranging electronic music for anime theme songs. In 2009, while living and teaching in a small village in North Carolina, she released “Signal".

== Signal ==
Signal deals with ephemeral and spiritual themes. Furukawa says, "each song is a different type of ceremonial goodbye song. I lost my Japanese grandmother while I was working on this album, and went through some enormous life transitions with relationships and work and travel. Like the snow falling gracefully to make everything perfect for a day, many things in our lives are transitory. I guess this album was really coming to grips with that and trying to find the beauty and meaning in it." Furukawa has also composed a bilingual children's album, "The Adventures of Chibi Neko Chan." A limited release of some of the songs have been used for charity programs. It will officially be released through her website in the future.

== Discography ==
Year	Album title
2009	Signal
2006	Reaching the Dragon
2005	Pearl Diver
2001	This Moment Is The Show

== Sources ==
- Anime News Service 2005
- Linus Lam Network News 2005
- Anime Web Turnpike 2006
- Lisa Furukawa convention appearances on AnimeCons.com
- Otaku Generation Interview 2006
- Featured performer in Siren Song Magazine
- J-Pop World Interview 2009
