= Wilhelm Ramsøe =

Danish composer and conductor

Wilhelm Ramsøe (7 February 1837 – 15 April 1895) was a Danish composer, musician and conductor.

== Biography ==
Emilio Wilhelm Ramsøe was born in Copenhagen, the second of five children. His father, Emilius Wilhelm Ramsøe (1807–1858), was a professional oboe-player; his mother was Anne (née Rasmussen) (1808–1889). He had four siblings, Kirstine (born 1833), Frederik (born 1840), Louis (born 1843), and Alvilda (born 1846). He was christened in 1837 at Garnison parish. Later, the family moved to the area of Nørregade in neighborhood of Nørre Kvarter in Copenhagen.

== Career ==
Ramsøe began playing violin at a very young age. At 17 years old, he became a conductor at actors guild for traveling theater companies; he conducted concerts in Denmark and Norway. Between 1857 and 1864, he conducted several concerts and performances at the newly built 2,000-seat concert hall Alhambra which opened in 1857. It was during this time that Ramsøe established his reputation as a conductor and composer; this led to his appointment as music director at the then-popular Folketheateret. From 1864 to 1875 he continued to conduct, while also composing and arranging various comedies. However, after a difference of opinion with the Folketheateret theater director, Michael Wallem Brun (1819–91), Ramsøe left the theatre and moved to Stockholm.

In approximately 1877, he moved to St Petersburg, first working as a viola player in the Italian opera orchestra, and later at the Bolshoi Theatre with the Russian opera orchestra. In 1887 he was engaged as the Royal music director at the Mikhaylovsky Theatre opera and ballet house. He returned annually to Copenhagen for summer vacations and conducted the symphonic wind band of Rosenborg Brøndkuranstalt, which played every morning in Rosenborg Park.

== Marriage and later illness ==
On 5 September 1863, Ramsøe married Mathilde Marie Strandmann-Petersen (1841–1891) in Copenhagen. His last years were plagued by bad health; he died in St. Hans Hospital, Roskilde. He was 58 years old.

== Contributions ==
Ramsøe is today most known for:

- 5 quartets for Brass instruments (Op. 20, 29, 30, 37 & 38), that are all still in print.
- Musical comedies: Gjöngehøvdingen, Svantevits Datter & Kanariefuglen, among others.
- He also composed some smaller works, such as a few Lieder and a Romanze for viola and piano.
