= Detmold (disambiguation) =

Detmold is a city in Germany.

Detmold may also refer to:

- Detmold (region) in Germany
- Detmold, Maryland, a location in the United States
- Detmold (surname)

== See also ==
- Detmold child, a mummy of a child found in Peru now held at Lippisches Land Museum in Detmold, Germany
