= Georg Carstensen =

Danish army officer

Coordinates: 55°41′43″N 12°35′1.5″E

- Georg Carstensen, 1845
- Born: 31 August 1812
- Died: 4 January 1857 (aged 44)
- Military career
- Allegiance: Danish
- Branch: Army
- Rank: Lieutenant
- Unit: Royal Guards

Johan Bernhard Georg Carstensen (31 August 1812 – 4 January 1857) was a Danish army officer and one of the developers of Tivoli Gardens. He spent most of his childhood in the Near East. He travelled widely and had a career in the military Royal Guards, reaching the rank of lieutenant. He attended boarding school at Herlufsholm kostskole.

In 1839, Carstensen moved to Copenhagen permanently and published the periodical publications Portefeuillen and Figaro.

Between 1843 and 1848, Carstensen was active in the development of Tivoli Gardens and Casino Theatre (Copenhagen) after which he joined the First Schleswig War. He learned that he was no longer required in Tivoli shortly after he returned. He was thought to have abandoned the project as he did not extend the license of the construction.

Following the disagreement with others in the Tivoli Gardens management, Carstensen travelled to the Danish West Indies and joined the army there. He was married to the daughter of an island planter and assisted in management of the property. He subsequently spent time in New York City where he designed the New York Crystal Palace – an exhibition building constructed for the Exhibition of the Industry of All Nations in 1853 – in collaboration with the German architect Charles Gildemeister.

== Alhambra ==
In 1855, Carstensen returned to Copenhagen and attempted to construct an establishment to rival Tivoli Gardens, the Alhambra in Frederiksberg. The only reminiscent left of this failed project is a street named Alhambravej. The establishment failed to be completed during Carstensen's lifetime. He died on 4 January 1857 at age 44.

== Relatives ==
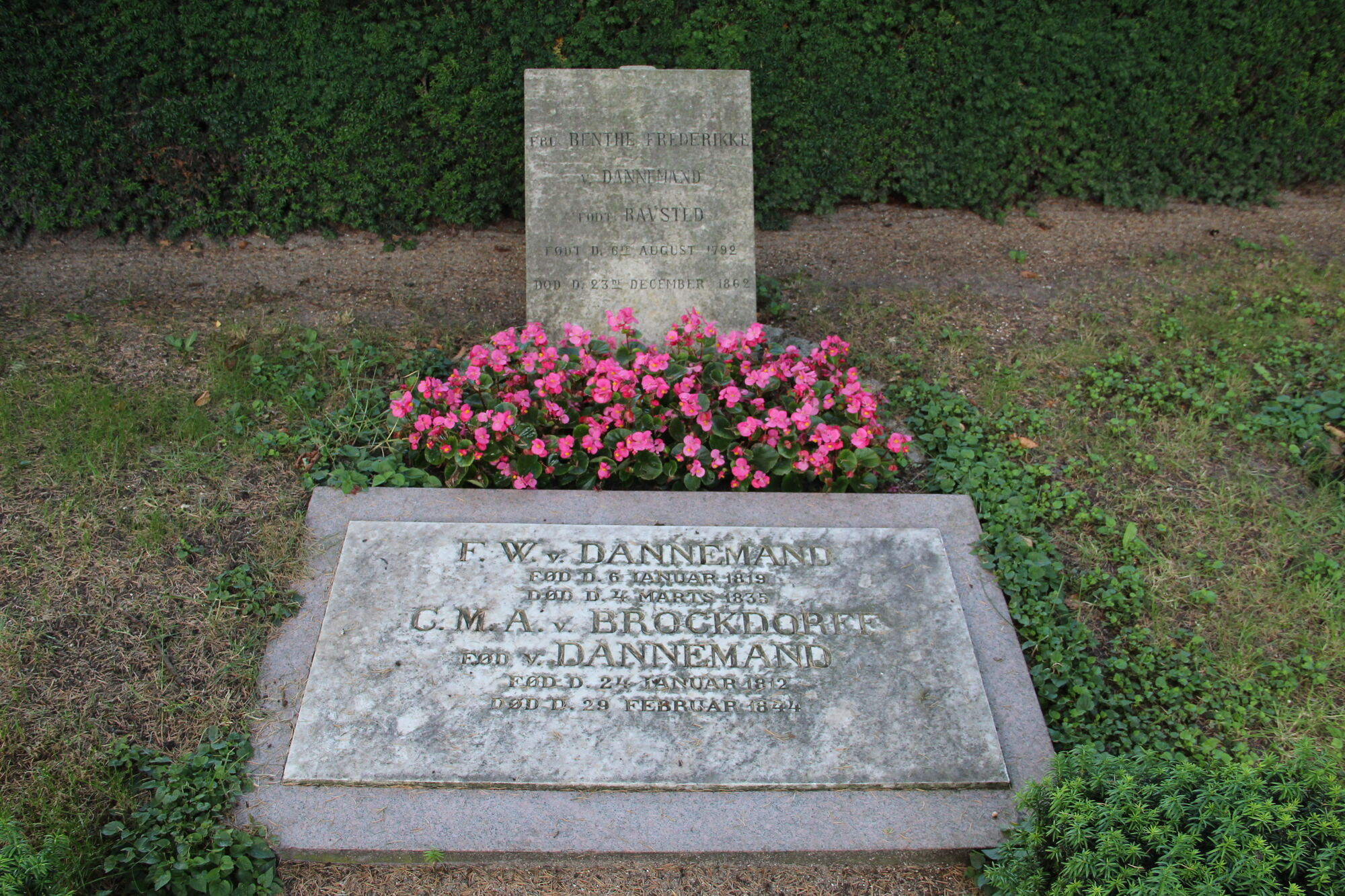
Carstensen's tombstone in Copenhagen's Garrison Cemetery.

Georg's sister, Annette Adelaide Christine Carstensen, was the mother of Sir Robert Hay-Drummond-Hay, whose second wife Grace Marguerite Hay Drummond-Hay was the first woman to travel airborne from Europe to the US as well as the first woman to circumnavigate the globe in the air. Both of these were achieved aboard a Zeppelin.
