= Shuldham =

Shuldham is a surname and given name.

Notable people with the surname include:

- Edward Barton Shuldham (1837–1924), British physician and homeopath
- Molyneux Shuldham, 1st Baron Shuldham (c. 1717–1798), Royal Navy officer
- Thomas Shuldham O'Halloran (1797-1870), first Police Commissioner and Police Magistrate of South Australia
- Thomas Shuldham O'Halloran (lawyer) (1865–1945), lawyer and Australian rules football administrator
- Walter Shuldham (1892–1971), English cricketer

Notable people with the given name include:

- Shuldham Redfern (1895–1985), British civil servant in the Sudan and Canada
