= Christian Edward Detmold =

Civil engineer

- Born: 2 February 1810
- Died: 2 July 1887 (aged 77)
- Engineering career
- Discipline: civil engineering

Christian Edward Detmold (2 February 1810 Hanover – 2 July 1887 New York City) was a civil engineer.

== Biography ==
He was educated at the military academy in Hanover, and came to New York in 1826, with the intention of entering the Brazilian army. Unfavorable accounts of the conditions in Brazil induced him to remain in the United States, and he became well known as an engineer. In 1827 he made many surveys in Charleston, South Carolina, and vicinity for the Charleston & Hamburg Railroad and Canal Co., and in 1828 made the drawings for the first locomotive built by the Kembles in New York. His survey work was completed in 1830. 1833-1834 he was in the employ of the U. S. War Department, and superintended the laying of the foundations of Fort Sumter during the illness of the engineer in charge of the work.

After making surveys for railroads in various parts of the country, he became interested in the manufacture of iron, and introduced several improvements, including the utilization of the waste gases from blast and other furnaces. 1845-1852 he engaged in this manufacture in Lonaconing, Maryland. He was named chief architect and engineer of the New York Crystal Palace, but clashed repeatedly with the two architects who actually designed the building, Georg Carstensen and Karl Gildemeister, ultimately depriving them of credit for their work. Detmold hired Horatio Allen, an associate during his surveying work, as consulting engineer. Afterward, he spent some years traveling in Europe. He then became president of the New Jersey Zinc Company, built their works at Newark, and originated and successfully developed the manufacture of “spiegel” iron from the residue of the zinc ore. He then engaged in coal mining.

Failing health forced him to go to Europe, where he lived, most of the time in Paris, until his return to New York in 1885. He published a translation of the principal historical, political, and diplomatic writings of Machiavelli (4 vols., Boston, 1882). He also collected art.

== Family ==
He married Phoebe Crary and had two daughters. His brother, William Ludwig Detmold, was a noted surgeon who introduced orthopedic surgery into the United States.

== See also ==
- Georges Creek Coal and Iron Company
