= William Ludwig Detmold =

German-American surgeon (1808–1894)

- Born: 27 December 1808; Hanover, Germany
- Died: 26 December 1894 (aged 85); New York City, US
- Education: University of Göttingen
- Medical career
- Profession: surgeon and professor
- Sub-specialties: orthopedic surgery

William Ludwig Detmold (27 December 1808 Hanover – 26 December 1894 New York City) was a German-American surgeon who introduced orthopedic surgery into the United States.

== Biography ==
His father was a physician. William received his medical degree from the University of Göttingen in 1830, and enlisted as surgeon in the royal Hanoverian grenadier-guard. He went to the United States on leave of absence in 1837, and sent back his resignation from New York City.

Detmold introduced orthopedic surgery into the United States, and as early as 1841 he established an orthopedic clinic in New York, having previously published an article on orthopedic surgery in the American Journal of the Medical Sciences. He wrote infrequently for the medical journals and managed his dispensary until the beginning of the Civil War, when he assisted in the organization of the United States Army Medical Corps. He became professor of military surgery and hygiene at Columbia in 1862. In 1865 his title was changed to professor of clinical and military surgery. In 1866, the war being over, military surgery lost its prominence, and he was made professor emeritus.

During the war, he introduced a knife and fork for one-handed men, which was put by Surgeon General Barnes on the supply list, under the name of "Detmold's knife." In 1884, he was a founder and the first president of the New York County Medical Association, and at one time he was president of the Medical Relief Fund for Widows and Orphans.

== Publications ==
He published a book on the treatment of club foot and analogous subjects that was one of the milestones of the pre-Listerian epochs of orthopedics. He also published "Opening an Abscess in the Brain," in the Journal of the Medical Sciences for February 1850.

== Family ==
His brother, Christian Edward Detmold, also emigrated to the United States. He was an engineer, and among his projects he supervised the building and design of the New York Crystal Palace.
