= Edward Julius Detmold =

British illustrator (1883–1957)

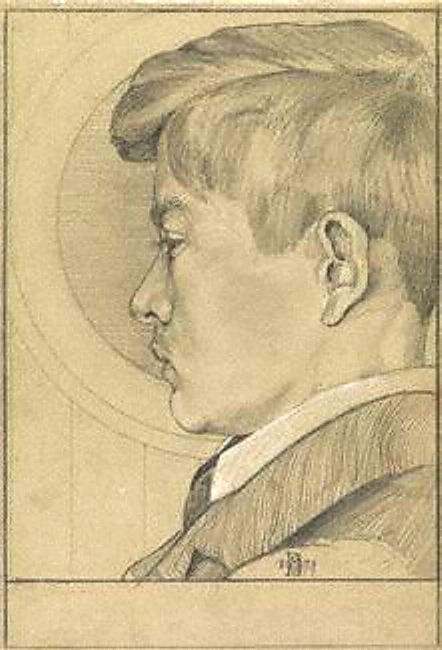
- Sketch of Edward Julius Detmold by his brother, Charles, 1899
- Born: 21 November 1883; Putney, Wandsworth, Surrey, England
- Died: 1 July 1957 (aged 73); Montgomery, Powys, Wales
- Occupation: Illustrator
- Era: Victorian
- Relatives: Charles Maurice Detmold (brother, 1883–1908); Edward Barton Shuldham (foster grandfather); Henry E. Detmold (uncle)

Edward Julius Detmold (21 November 1883, Putney, Wandsworth, Surrey – 1 July 1957, Montgomery, Powys) was an English Victorian and early twentieth-century painter, etcher, and book illustrator, who worked in collaboration with his twin brother Charles Maurice Detmold (1883–1908).

Sketch of Charles Maurice Detmold by Edward, 1899

== Biography and works ==
The Detmold twins' parents were Edward Detmold and Mary Agnes Luck. Their father, an electrical engineer, was absent for much of their childhood, and they lived with their mother and her foster father, Dr. Edward Barton Shuldham, who saw to their tuition and was a collector of porcelain and Japanese woodblock prints of plants and animals. Dr. Shuldham occupied a house on Upper Richmond Road, Putney, where the twins were born, and the family later moved to Hampstead. Both Dr. Shuldham and the twins' uncle, painter Henry E. Detmold, have been cited as primary influences on the twins' artistic work. Most of the twins' artistic output centered around the depiction of animal subjects, and their work showed influence from traditional Japanese art, Albrecht Dürer and, later, the Art Nouveau movement. They exhibited watercolour paintings at the Royal Academy and at the Royal Institute of Painters in Water Colours at the age of 13, earning praise from English painter Edward Burne-Jones.

The twins subsequently learned the techniques of watercolour etching and of colour printing with copper plates, buying a printing press and producing their own proofs at home. During this time, they also spent extended periods of time near Steyning, in Sussex, where the family owned a country cottage. In 1898, they compiled a portfolio of colour etchings of animals and flowering plants done in the Japanese style and collaborated on the etchings and illustrations for their first book, Pictures From Birdland, published in 1899. This book resulted from a number of drawings being shown in the autumn of 1897 to publisher J. M. Dent, who was impressed and asked the two brothers to provide coloured illustrations for a book of his. The first title mooted was Alphabet of Birds, eventually becoming Pictures from Birdland. This was followed in 1900 by an exhibition at the Fine Art Society's Gallery in London.

Particularly noticeable are the early influences in the paintings, Edward's design for an osprey, with its unusual water effects, testifying to a Japanese contribution. Already apparent is that style in which a searching study of natural forms, especially bird plumage, is subordinated to the decorative arrangement.

— David Larkin, The Fantastic Creatures of Edward Julius Detmold

Their next joint project was to produce a set of 16 watercolours for Rudyard Kipling's The Jungle Book, published as a folio in 1903, and in book form in 1908, by Macmillan. The success of their painting careers seemed assured, but Maurice ended his life by inhaling chloroform in April 1908, shortly before they were due to leave for a holiday in Sussex with Dr. Shuldham, who had arranged that Maurice put down the household cats using the anesthetic.

Following his brother's death, in 1909, Edward illustrated The Fables of Aesop, producing 23 colour plates and a host of pen and ink drawings. In 2006, the Folio Society of London published a facsimile of the original Hodder & Stoughton edition of the collection.

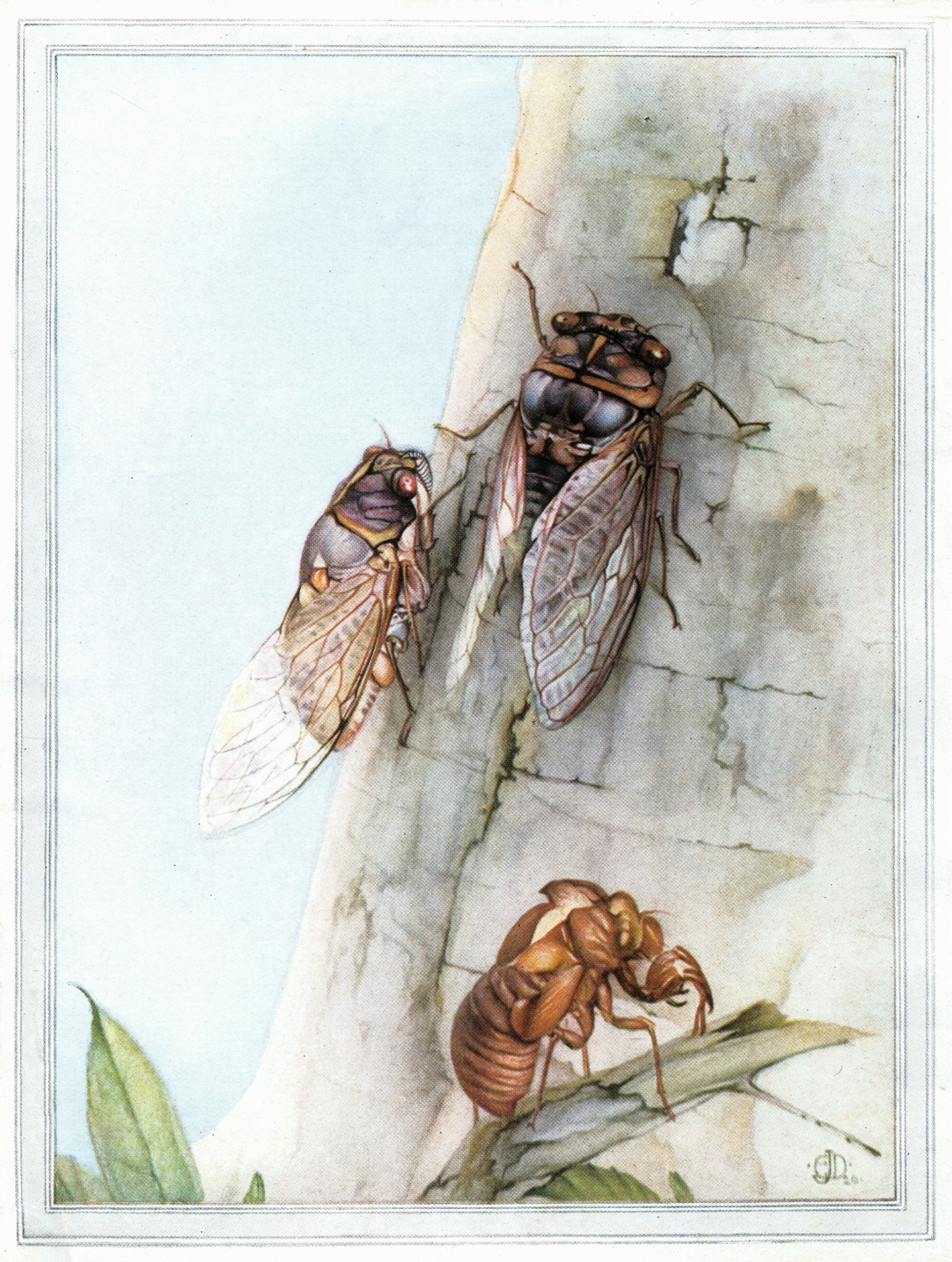
The cicada Melampsalta montana, illustrated by Edward Julius Detmold, from Fabre's Book of Insects (1921)

In 1911, Detmold worked on illustrations for Maurice Maeterlinck's The Life of the Bee, Camille Lemonnier's Birds and Beasts, and Florence Dugdale's Book of Baby Beasts. In the following year, he worked on Maeterlinck's Hours of Gladness; in 1913, on Florence Dugdale's Book of Baby Birds; and in 1919, on W. H. Hudson's Birds in Town and Village. During the First World War, Edward Detmold sought recognition as a conscientious objector, but this was denied by the official tribunal, and he was forcibly conscripted in a training unit attached to the Middlesex Regiment. In 1919, he also produced a portfolio of Twenty Four Nature Pictures and, in 1921, illustrated Our Little Neighbours and Jean-Henri Fabre's Book of Insects. Edward took up etching again in 1922 after Campbell Dodgson praised the Detmolds' work in The Print Collector's Quarterly.

1923 saw the appearance of Rainbow Houses. In 1924, Hodder & Stoughton published The Arabian Nights – Tales from the Thousand and One Nights, a book that had been planned before Maurice's death. As with The Fables of Aesop, Detmold's illustrations for The Arabian Nights were republished as a facsimile edition from the Folio Society in 2003. Critics have compared Detmold's images with the work of the Pre-Raphaelites.

Detmold also published three short unillustrated works (two of them issued anonymously) expressing his spiritual beliefs. In the 1930s, he continued to paint bird and flower watercolours, some of which were sold by a private gallery in Sussex, and he created a series of anti-war paintings with accompanying text, entitled "The Truth", which were never published. He lived in London, sharing a house with his mother, artist Sidney Laurence Biddle, and musician Harold Ranken Hulls, until the outbreak of the Second World War, when the household moved first to Sussex and then to Montgomeryshire. In his final years, he retired completely from public life. Although he continued to paint, he suffered a period of depression, brought on by failing eyesight, that resulted in his committing suicide by shooting himself in the chest in July 1957, aged 73.

== Gallery ==
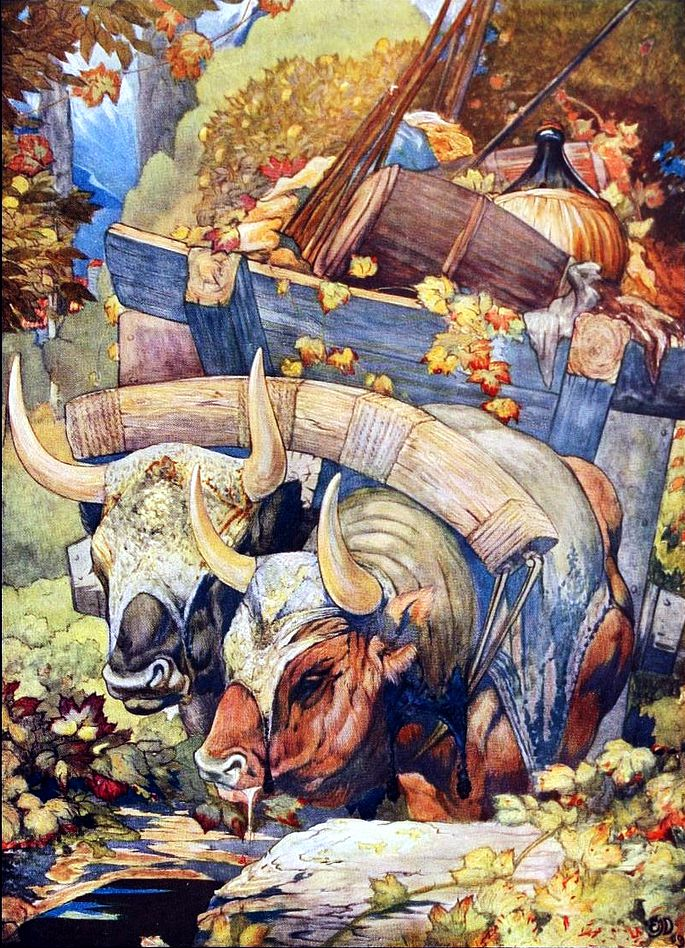
"The Oxen and the Axle Trees" from The Fables of Aesop, 1909

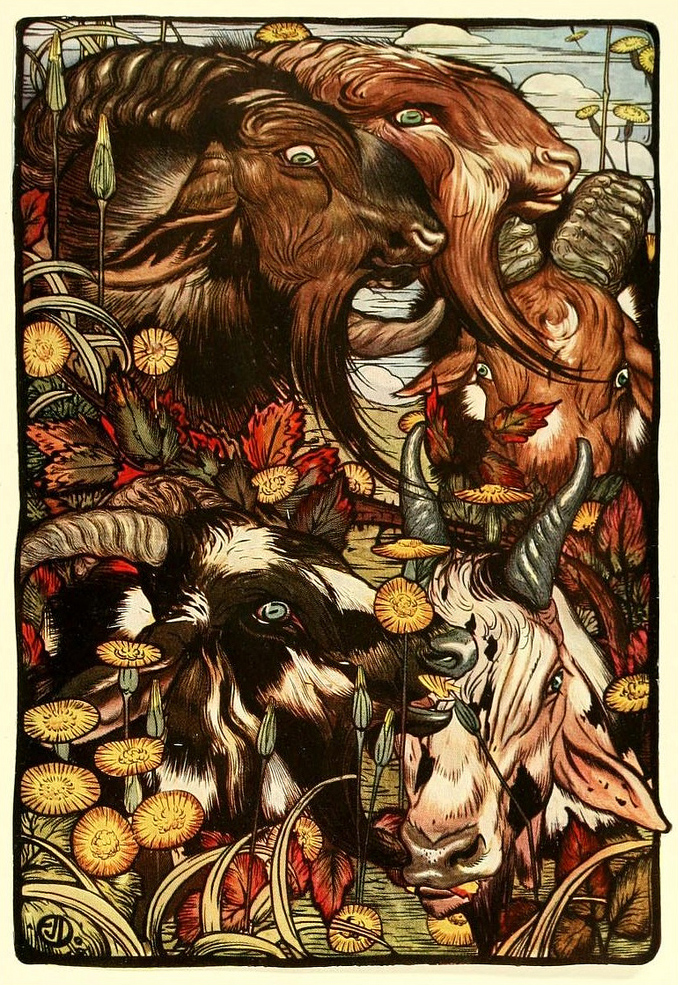
"Goats" from The Fables of Aesop, 1909

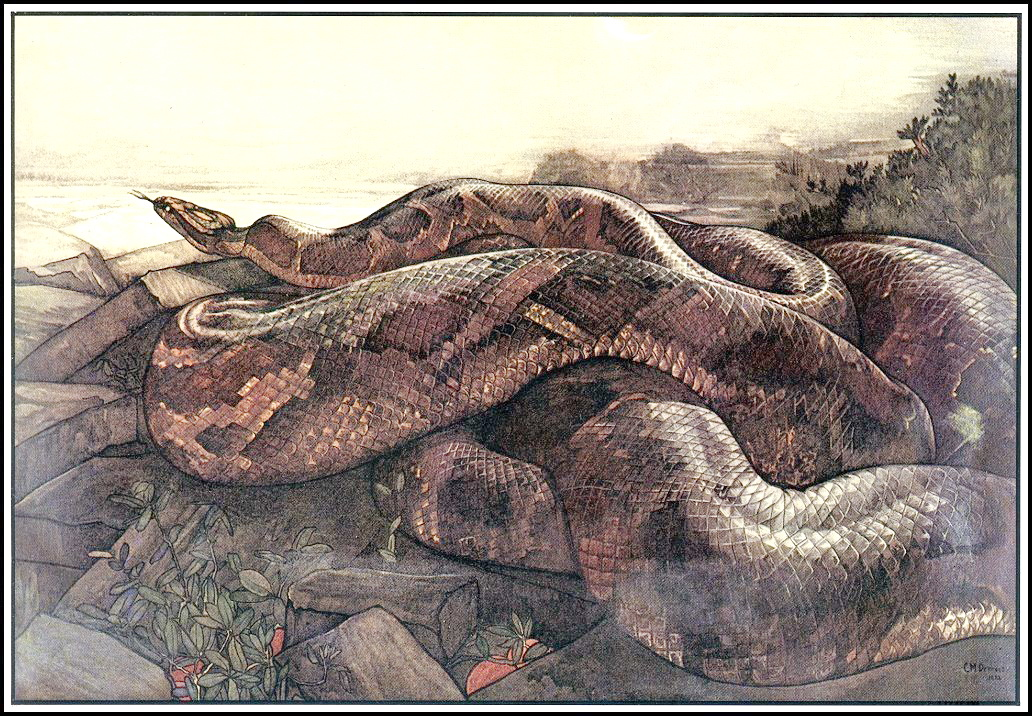
"Kaa the Python"; 1908 plate from The Jungle Book by Rudyard Kipling

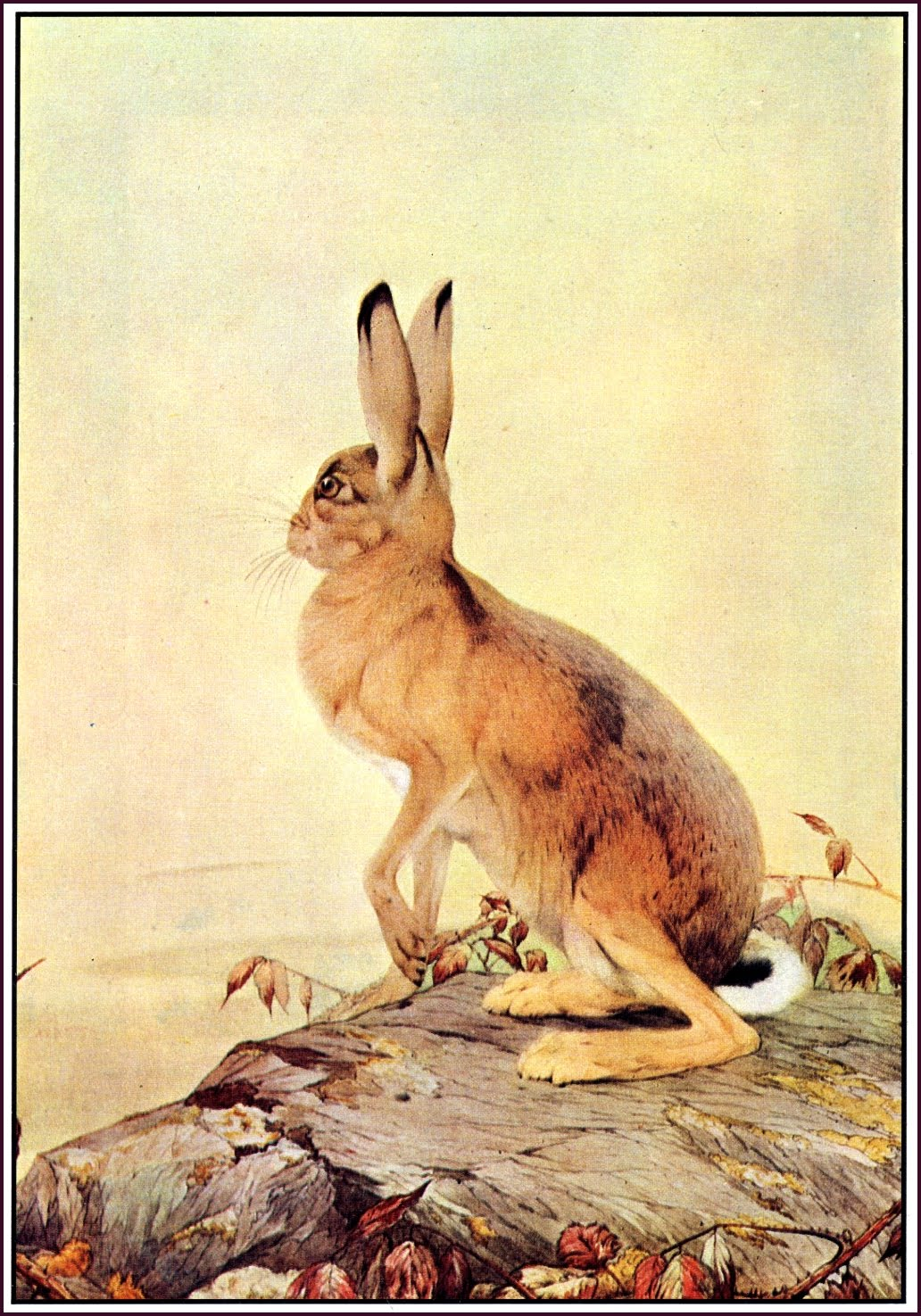
"The Hare and the Tortoise" from The Fables of Aesop, 1909

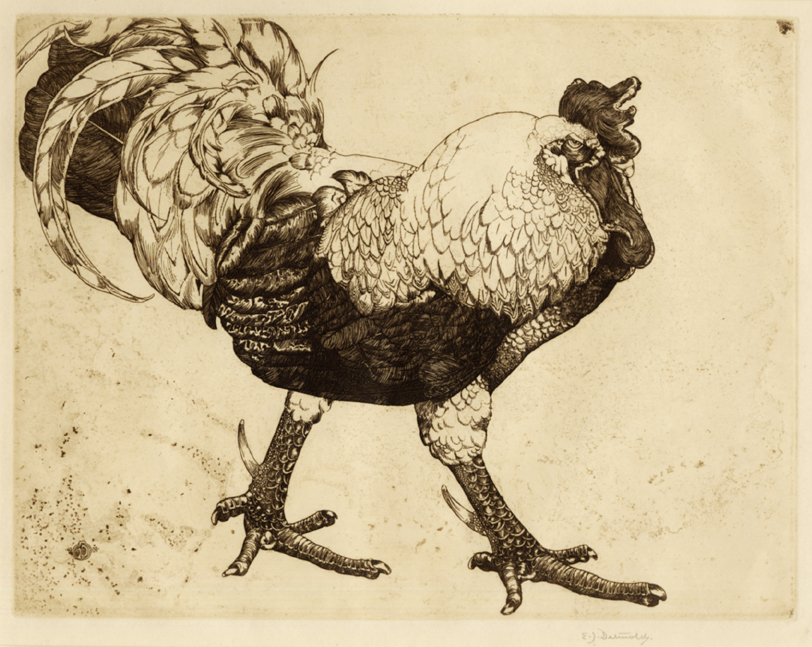
Cockerel etching, 1917

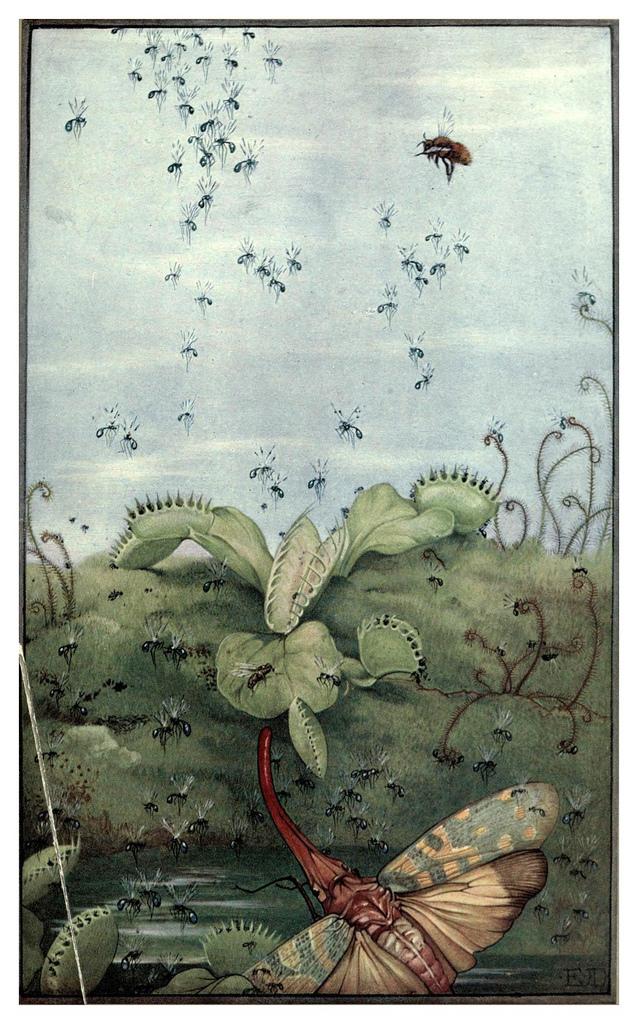
Dionaea muscipula and Laternaria candelaria from News of Spring and Other Nature Studies, 1917

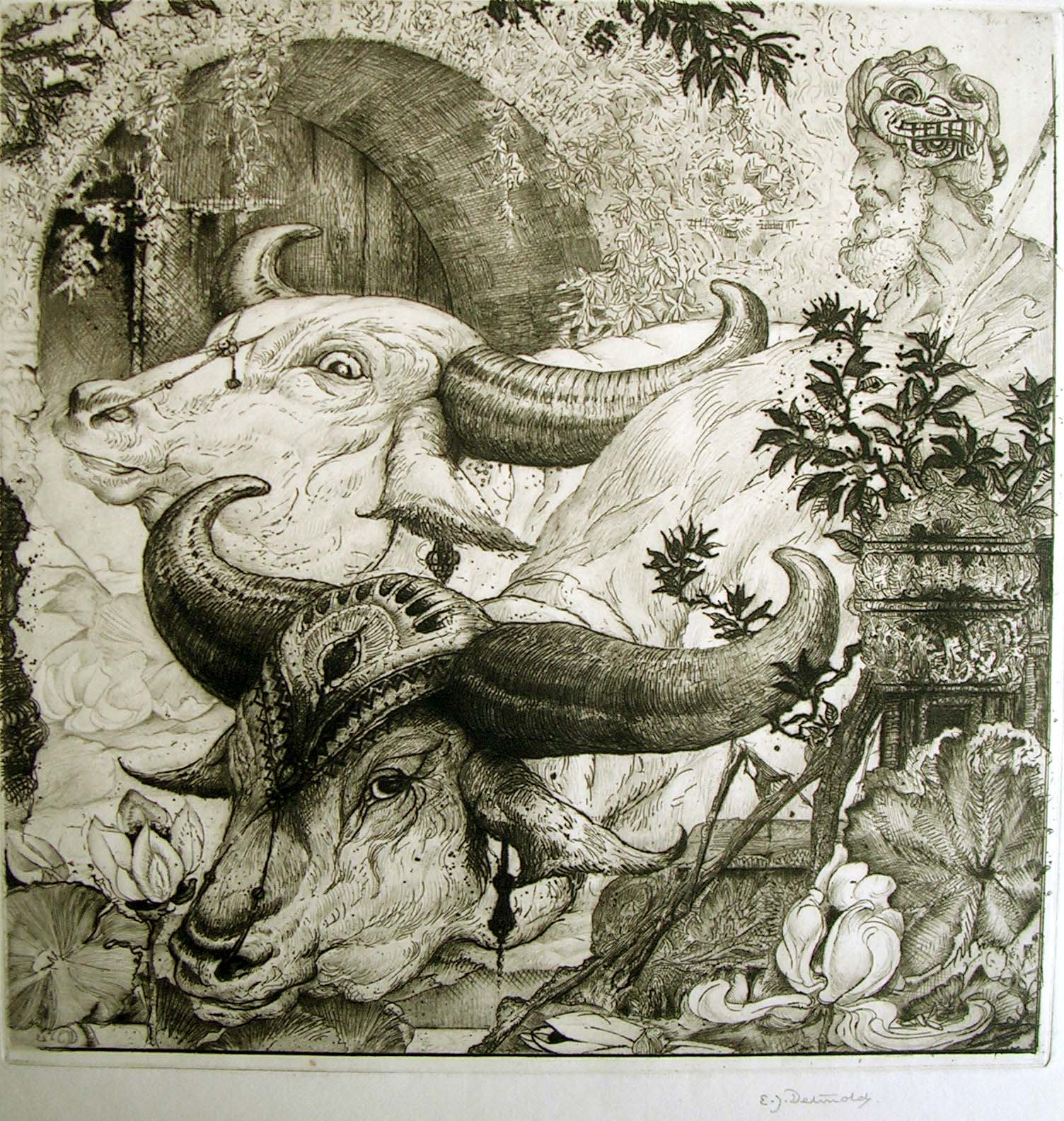
"At the Edge of the Lotus Pool" etching and drypoint, c. 1900

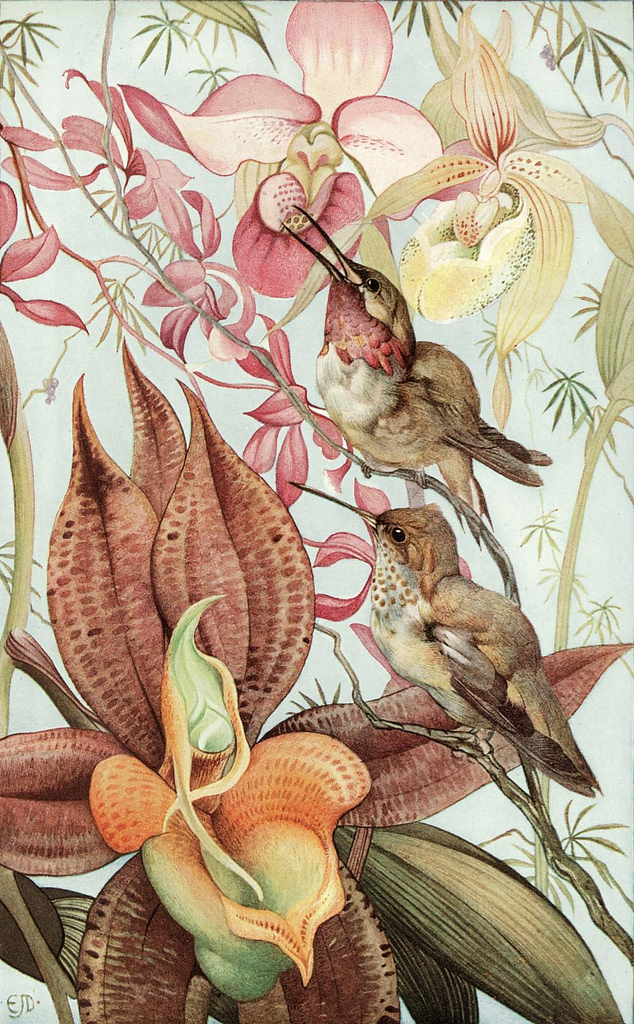
Catasetum and Cypripedium from News of Spring and Other Nature Studies, 1917
