= Middle Tennessee Anime Convention =

Anime convention

Coordinates: 36°8′41.6″N 86°40′58.6″W

Middle Tennessee Anime Convention (MTAC)
- Status: Active
- Genre: Anime, Manga, Popular Arts
- Venue: Sheraton Music City Hotel; Embassy Suites Nashville Airport
- Location: Nashville, Tennessee
- Country: United States
- Inaugurated: 1999
- Attendance: 9,796 in 2013
- Organizer: Southeast Pop Arts & Culture (SEPOP)
- Website: http://www.mtac.net/

The Middle Tennessee Anime Convention (MTAC) is an annual three day anime convention held during March/April at the Sheraton Music City Hotel and Embassy Suites Nashville Airport in Nashville, Tennessee.

== Programming ==
The convention typically features an AMV contest, artists alley, charity auction, cosplay contest, dealers room, gaming (arcade, board, card, console, tabletop), Japanese Fashion Shows, Lolita Tea Party, a ramen eating contest, rave, and panels. Table Top and Video Gaming runs 24 hours a day during the convention.

== History ==
Tommy Yune was unable to attend the convention in 2010 due to the funeral of Carl Macek. MTAC delayed closing the 2010 convention due to the 2010 Tennessee floods for the members who could not leave. The convention in 2012 shared the Nashville Convention Center with the Full Moon Tattoo and Horror Festival. Due to attendance growth, the convention expanded into additional space in the convention center and hotel in 2013. The dealer's room in 2016 experienced long lines. MTAC 2020 was postponed due to the COVID-19 pandemic, and later rescheduled to 2021. MTAC 2021 was cancelled due to the COVID-19 pandemic.

=== Event history ===
| Dates | Location | Atten. | Guests |
|---|---|---|---|
| December 10–11, 1999 | Days Inn Nashville Airport; Nashville, Tennessee | 300 | |
| November 2–4, 2001 | Clarion Hotel; Nashville, Tennessee | 400 | Tiffany Grant, Sonny Strait, Bill Timoney, and Kira Vincent-Davis. |
| August 9–11, 2002 | Days Inn Nashville Airport; Nashville, Tennessee | 400 | Steve Bennett, Rozie Curtis, Takayuki Karahashi, Sherry Lynn, and Jan Scott-Frazier. |
| April 2–4, 2004 | Nashville Marriott at Vanderbilt University; Nashville, Tennessee | 1,000 | Greg Ayres, Robert DeJesus, Monica Rial, and Doug Smith. |
| April 1–3, 2005 | Millennium Maxwell House Hotel; Nashville, Tennessee | 1,750 | Brent Allison, Greg Ayres, Laura Bailey, Colleen Clinkenbeard, Emily DeJesus, Robert DeJesus, Lisa Furukawa, Kevin McKeever, Vic Mignogna, Monica Rial, and Steve Yun. |
| April 21–23, 2006 | Embassy Suites Nashville South; Franklin, Tennessee | 2,500 | Greg Ayres, Steve Blum, Emily DeJesus, Robert DeJesus, Lisa Furukawa, Caitlin Glass, Scott Kurtz, Vic Mignogna, Para2Mahou, Jan Scott-Frazier, Doug Smith, and Travis Willingham. |
| April 13–15, 2007 | Cool Springs Conference Center (Marriott); Franklin, Tennessee | 3,100 | Lisa Furukawa, Tiffany Grant, Matt Greenfield, Mohammad "Hawk" Haque, Neil Kaplan, Kevin McKeever, Yad-Ming Mui, Ananth Panagariya, Peelander-Z, The Protomen, Doug Smith, and Steve Yun. |
| April 25–27, 2008 | Sheraton Music City; Nashville, Tennessee | 3,750 | Greg Ayres, James L. Barry, Johnny Yong Bosch, Chickenbox!, Eyeshine, Kaiju Big Battel, The Man Power, Mega Ran, Nashville Lotus Taiko Team, Peelander-Z, The Slants, Doug Smith, and DJ TX300. |
| April 3–5, 2009 | Sheraton Music City; Nashville, Tennessee | 4,200 | James L. Barry, Jonathan Brands, Lisa Furukawa, Yaya Han, Mohammad "Hawk" Haque, Steve Horton, The Man Power, Jeff Nimoy, The Notorious MSG, Colleen O'Shaughnessey, Ananth Panagariya, Sam Romero, The Slants, Sonny Strait, and Jeong Mo Yang. |
| April 30-May 2, 2010 | Sheraton Music City; Nashville, Tennessee | 4,200 (Note: Affected by 2010 Tennessee floods.) | Laura Bailey, Jason Canty, Lisa Furukawa, Kaiju Big Battel, Neil Kaplan, The Man Power, Vic Mignogna, Yad-Ming Mui, Colleen O'Shaughnessey, Quaff, Jan Scott-Frazier, Doug Smith, Spike Spencer, Sonny Strait, Travis Willingham, and Steve Yun. |
| April 22–24, 2011 | Sheraton Music City; Nashville, Tennessee | 5,640 | Action Adventure World, Robert Axelrod, Blue Grade, The Eric Stuart Band, Lisa Furukawa, Garth Graham, Yuri Lowenthal, The Man Power, Vic Mignogna, Reni Mimura, My Parents Favorite Music, Tara Platt, The Protomen, Shammers, The Slants, Eric Stuart, ST~Prime, and The Suzan. |
| April 6–8, 2012 | Nashville Convention Center and Renaissance Nashville Hotel; Nashville, Tennessee | 7,200 | Jason David Frank, Head Phones President, Kyle Hebert, Kaiju Big Battel, Jason Charles Miller, Yad-Ming Mui, Pinn Panelle, Eric Stuart, and Symphonic Anime Orchestra. |
| March 29–31, 2013 | Nashville Convention Center and Renaissance Nashville Hotel; Nashville, Tennessee | 9,796 | Chris Cason, Jennifer Cihi, Todd Haberkorn, Brittney Karbowski, Jamie Marchi, Pinn Panelle, Monica Rial, The Slants, and Symphonic Anime Orchestra. |
| April 18–20, 2014 | Embassy Suites Nashville; SE - Murfreesboro; Murfreesboro, Tennessee | | Bea Billany, Jillian Coglan, Samurai Dan Coglan, DJ Pete Ellison, Dan Green, Samantha Inoue-Harte, Vedetta Marie, Vic Mignogna, Marin M. Miller, Chii Sakurabi, and Eric Stuart. |
| April 3–5, 2015 | Sheraton Music City Hotel; Nashville Airport Marriott; Nashville, Tennessee | | Bea Billany, Junko Fujiyama, Tiffany Grant, Matthew Lassiter, Marble Hornets, Erica Mendez, Matthew Mercer, Marin M. Miller, Jeff Nimoy, Robert J. Schwalb, Micah Solusod, Sonny Strait, J. Michael Tatum, and Vedetta Marie. |
| March 25–27, 2016 | Sheraton Music City Hotel; Embassy Suites Nashville Airport; Nashville, Tennessee | | Bea Billany, Darrel Guilbeau, Matthew Lassiter, Vic Mignogna, Marin M. Miller, Bryce Papenbrook, Robert J. Schwalb, Eric Stuart, Kaiji Tang, and Vedetta Marie. |
| April 14–16, 2017 | Sheraton Music City Hotel; Embassy Suites Nashville Airport; Nashville, Tennessee | | Bea Billany, Jessie James Grelle, Lotus Juice, Nina "Mango Sirene" Lynn, Mike McFarland, Marin M. Miller, Cassandra Lee Morris, and Keith Silverstein. |
| March 30 - April 1, 2018 | Sheraton Music City Hotel; Embassy Suites Nashville Airport; Nashville, Tennessee | | Bea Billany, SungWon Cho, Yuri Lowenthal, Vic Mignogna, Marin M. Miller, Tara Platt, Robert J. Schwalb, and David Vincent. |
| April 19–21, 2019 | Sheraton Music City Hotel; Embassy Suites Nashville Airport; Nashville, Tennessee | | Bea Billany, Jessie James Grelle, Jerry Jewell, Erica Mendez, Marin M. Miller, Trina Nishimura, The Slants, Kaiji Tang, and Sarah Anne Williams. |
| April 15-17, 2022 | Grand Hyatt Nashville; Nashville, Tennessee | | Ricco Fajardo, Caitlin Glass, Xanthe Huynh, Cherami Leigh, Adam McArthur, Bryce Papenbrook, and Kari Wahlgren. |
| April 7-9, 2023 | Sheraton Music City Hotel; Embassy Suites Nashville Airport; Nashville, Tennessee | | Bennett Abara, Beau Billingslea, KingChris, Kyle McCarley, Marin M. Miller, None Like Joshua, and Anairis Quiñones. |
| March 29-31, 2024 | Sheraton Music City Hotel; Embassy Suites Nashville Airport; Nashville, Tennessee | | Tiana Camacho, SungWon Cho, Justin Cook, Kohei Hattori, David Matranga, and Bryce Papenbrook. |
| April 18-20, 2025 | Sheraton Music City Hotel; Embassy Suites Nashville Airport; Nashville, Tennessee | | Ed Chavez, Ricco Fajardo, MC Frontalot, Lauren Landa, Robert McCollum, Jason Charles Miller, Alexis Tipton, and Natalie Van Sistine. |
| April 3-5, 2026 | Sheraton Music City Hotel; Embassy Suites Nashville Airport; Nashville, Tennessee | | Dawn M. Bennett, John Bentley, Jessie James Grelle, Megan Hollingshead, and Molly Zhang. |
