= Latting Observatory =

Tower in New York City

Coordinates: 40°45′15″N 73°58′56″W

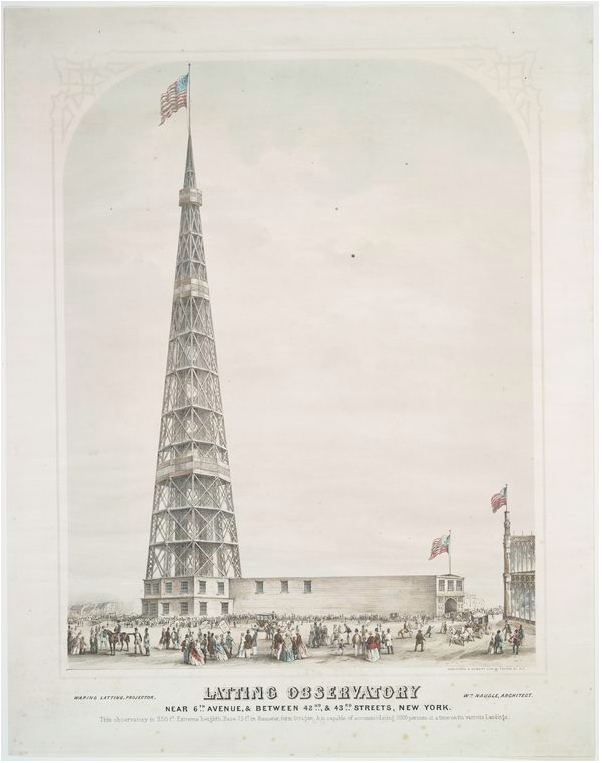
- Latting Observatory in 1853. The edge of the New York Crystal Palace can be seen at right.

General information
- Location: Manhattan, New York City
- Opened: 1853
- Demolished: 1856

Height
- Height: 315 ft (96 m)

Design and construction
- Architect: William Naugle

The Latting Observatory was a wooden tower in New York City built as part of the 1853 Exhibition of the Industry of All Nations, adjoining the New York Crystal Palace. It was located on the North side of 42nd Street between Fifth Avenue and Sixth Avenue across the street from the site of present-day Bryant Park. Conceived by Waring Latting and designed by architect William Naugle, the observatory was an octagonally-based, iron-braced wooden tower 315 feet (96 m) high adjoining the Crystal Palace, with landings at three levels on the structure, allowing visitors to see east into Queens, south into Staten Island, and west into New Jersey. The tower, taller than the spire of Trinity Church at 290 feet (88 m), was the tallest structure in New York City from the time it was constructed in 1853 until it was shortened in 1855. The tower's base was a 75-foot (23 m) square, tapering to a top of 6 to 8 feet (1.8 to 2.4 m). It could handle up to 1,500 people at a time. It burned down in 1856.

The Latting Observatory was an inspiration for the Eiffel Tower.

== Rise ==
The tallest building in the United States during its brief existence, and described afterwards as "New York's first skyscraper", the building's base featured shops and three landings, at 125 feet (38 m), 225 feet (69 m), and 300 feet (91 m), where telescopes allowed tourists to peer over their surroundings. The original specifications of the observatory called for a steam elevator to be installed to service all three heights, but that would have been unprecedented, since the tallest elevator then in existence was only 75 feet (23 m) high. None of the accounts of the tower mention steam elevators. Ascent was possible using winding stairways with several intermediate landings. In announcing the July 1, 1853 opening of the observatory to invited guests, a writer for The New York Times described that he "was not prepared for the wonderful panorama" which was said to reach from 40 to 60 miles (60 to 100 km), providing an incomparable view unavailable in London, Paris or from atop the Great Pyramid of Giza, as the tower rises in "the midst of a human hive, whose bees are the best in the world's apiary." The ascent to the top of the structure was described as "fatiguing, but it improves digestion."

== Demise ==
The building was acquired by the Hydeville Marble Works shortly after the end of the fair in 1854; the firm removed the top 75 feet of the tower a year later.

The observatory burned down in a fire that started between midnight and 1:00 AM on August 30, 1856, in a cooper's shop located at 49 West 43rd Street. The fire spread rapidly and attracted spectators from around the city, with flames that were visible for miles around. Though the fire destroyed more than twelve buildings and several families were left homeless, there were no known injuries or fatalities related to the incident. The Hydeville Marble Works, which owned the observatory, suffered a loss of $100,000 on merchandise and structures, of which $17,500 was covered by four different insurance companies. The New York Times described the fire as "one of the most destructive conflagrations that has occurred in the City for a long time..." with property valued at a total of $150,000 destroyed, most of which was accounted for by the tower itself. The Times described the tower as a "conspicuous landmark, by which the traveler could ascertain his whereabouts" and that it would be "greatly missed" despite the fact that as an investment it was "a stupendous failure" that never paid a return on the $150,000 in capital stock raised to erect the structure. Spectators feared that the tower would topple on and crush the north side of the Crystal Palace, but the observatory burned down on its base into a "mass of smouldering cinders". Fire companies from Williamsburg and elsewhere in Brooklyn were ferried across the East River to assist in extinguishing the blaze.

== Legacy ==
Engineer Gustave Eiffel acknowledged that the origin of the idea for an observation tower "came from America" but that his tower in Paris improved upon the American version in several ways. The Latting Observatory was built "without regard for beauty of form and purely for commercial purpose" in contrast to the Eiffel Tower, built some thirty years later with attention to form.

== See also ==
- List of tallest structures built before the 20th century
