= Chris Cason =

American voice actor

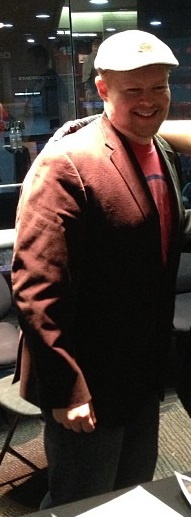
- Chris Cason at the 2013 MTAC.
- Occupations: Voice actor, ADR director, script writer
- Years active: 1998–present
- Employers: Funimation; Bang Zoom! Entertainment

Christopher S. Cason is an American voice actor for English-language productions of Japanese anime shows mostly with Funimation. Some of his major roles include Babbit in Kodocha, Haruki Hanai in School Rumble, Gluttony in Fullmetal Alchemist, and Shu in Dragon Ball. He has also worked as an ADR director and script writer for various studios.

== Filmography ==
=== Anime ===
- AM Driver - Kukk "KK" Karan
- Aria the Scarlet Ammo - Ryo Shiranui
- Arifureta: From Commonplace to World's Strongest Season 2 - Mikhail
- Baldr Force EXE Resolution - Genha
- Basilisk - Kazamachi Shogen
- BECK: Mongolian Chop Squad - Akage
- Beet the Vandel Buster - General Grineed
- Big Windup! - Kazutoshi Oki
- Birdy the Mighty: Decode - Masakubo
- Black Blood Brothers - Rinsuke Akai
- Case Closed - Bank Clerk, Shunen, Chiba, Emori
- Chrome Shelled Regios - Dixerio Maskane
- Corpse Princess - Rinsen Shirae
- D.Gray-man - No. 65
- Darker than Black - Yasuaki Ou
- Desert Punk - Wano
- Deadman Wonderland - Kōmoto
- The Devil Is a Part-Timer! - Tamura
- Dragon Ball series - Mr. Popo (DBZ Season 3, DBZ Kai, DBS), Tien (DBZ Season 3, original release), Shu, Rage Shenron, Super Kamikaze Ghosts, The Turtle (DBZ Season 3, DBZ Kai), Pintar, Gamisalas, Mule, Malaka (Remastered), Orlen (DBZ) (Funimation dub)
- Dragon Ball Super: Broly - Shu
- Dragon Ball Z: Battle of Gods - Shu
- Dragon Ball Z: Resurrection 'F' - Shu
- Fairy Tail - Karacka, Wally Buchanan, Richard Buchanan / Hoteye, Fortune Teller (Ep. 4)
- Fullmetal Alchemist - Gluttony
- Fullmetal Alchemist: Brotherhood - Gluttony
- Future Diary - Ryuji Kurosaki (Eps. 20-21, 24, 26)
- Glass Fleet - Gary
- Haganai - Kyou (Ep. 1)
- Hell Girl - Yoshiki Fukasawa
- Hetalia: Axis Powers - Holy Roman Empire
- Initial D - Hiroshi Fumihiro (Funimation dub)
- Is This a Zombie? of the Dead - Male Student (Ep. 1)
- Jormungand: Perfect Order - Hopkins (Ep. 9)
- Kamisama Kiss - Young Man (Ep. 1), Student (Ep. 2), Yokai (Ep. 6)
- Kaze no Stigma - Kousuke Utsumi
- Kenichi: The Mightiest Disciple - Tochumaru, Siegfried
- Kodocha - Babbit
- Level E - Tanaka
- MF Ghost - Fumihiro Joyu
- Michiko and Hatchin - Nuno (Clown, Eps. 9, 11)
- My Bride Is a Mermaid - Octopus Nakajima
- Nabari no Ou - Kagero
- Negima! - Albert Chamomile
- One Piece - Leo, Popo, Rice Rice, Satori, Fuza, Chirp Chirp, Tararan, Pappagu (Funimation dub)
- Ouran High School Host Club - Chikage Ukyo
- Psycho-Pass - Yuji Kanehara (Eps. 3, 6)
- PuraOre! Pride of Orange - Shunzo Nishigori
- The Sacred Blacksmith - Reginald Drummond
- Save Me! Lollipop - Air Fish (Ep. 2), Dragon (Ep. 6), Imai, Kitty (Ep. 1), Owl (Eps. 1-2, 7, 12), Step Cat (Ep. 12), Stuffed Bear (Ep. 11)
- Scarlet Nexus - Fubuki Spring
- School Rumble - Haruki Hanai
- Sengoku Basara II - Takenaka Hanbei
- The Seven Deadly Sins - Marmas, Narrator
- Sgt. Frog - Taruru
- Crayon Shin-chan (Funimation dub) - Boo, Whitey
- Soul Eater - Jack the Ripper
- Space Dandy - Register (Ep. 13)
- Speed Grapher - Misaski
- Sword Art Online II - Tecchi
- The Tower of Druaga: The Aegis of Uruk - Druaga
- Toriko - Bei
- Tsubasa: Reservoir Chronicle - Kerebos, Yuto Kigai
- YuYu Hakusho - Miyamoto, M1

=== Video games ===
- Borderlands 2 - Mal, Face McShooty, Winters, Yanier
- Borderlands: The Pre-Sequel! - Doctor Autohn, King Scumstain, Wolf
- Case Closed: The Mirapolis Investigation - Al Watson
- Detective Pikachu - Additional voices
- Dragon Ball series - Shu, Orlen, Mr. Popo, Turtle
- Fire Emblem Echoes: Shadows of Valentia - Forsyth
- Fullmetal Alchemist 2: Curse of the Crimson Elixir - Gluttony
- Scarlet Nexus - Fubuki Spring
- Shenmue III - Additional Cast
- Street Fighter X Tekken - Mega Man
- The Walking Dead: Survival Instinct - Deputy Jimmy Blake, Flight Command, Sniper 2
- Xenoblade Chronicles X - Tatsu
- Re:Zero − Starting Life in Another World: The Prophecy of the Throne - Russell Fellow

=== Live-action ===
- Chuck E. Cheese in the Galaxy 5000 - Mr. Munch (in-suit performer), Reporter

=== Crew ===
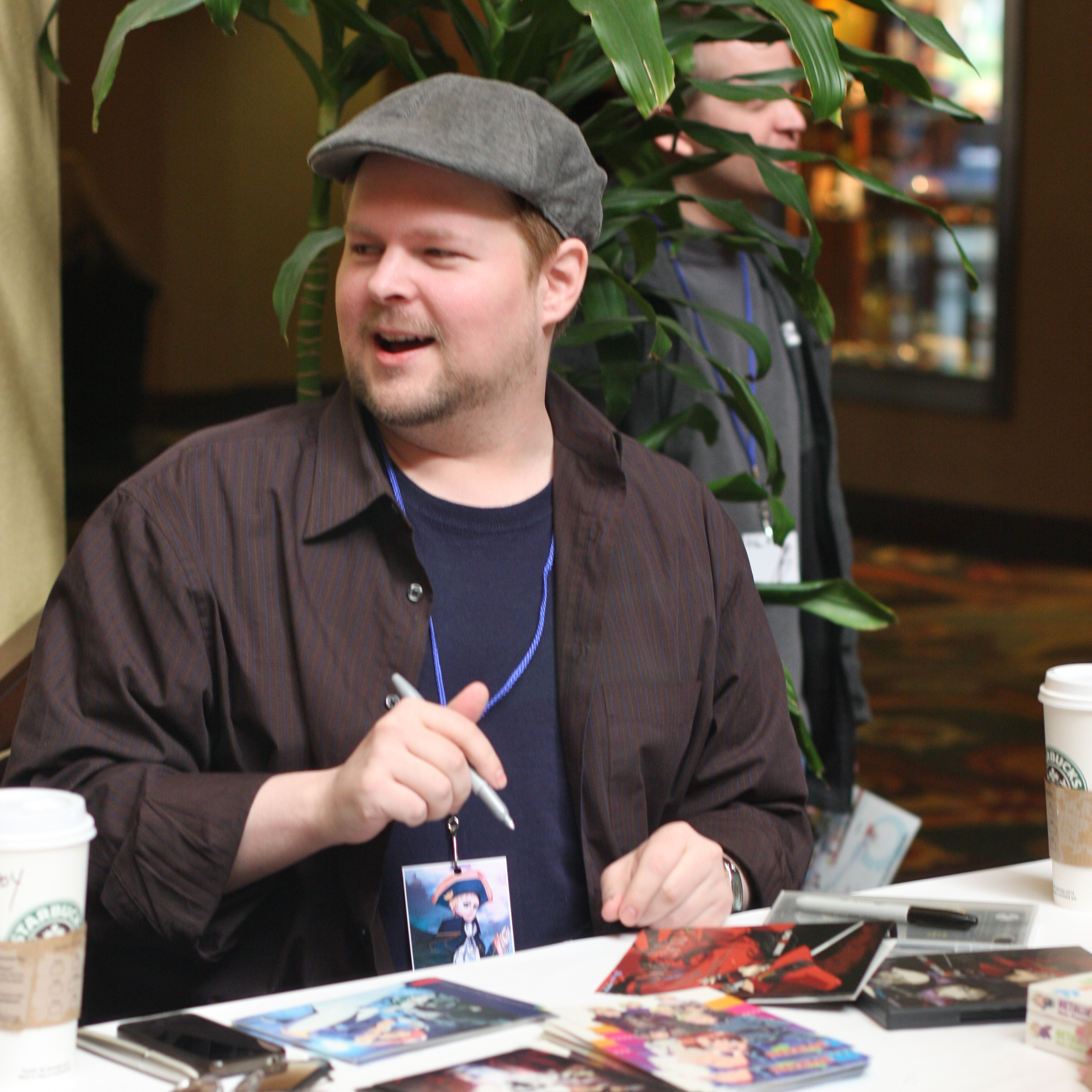
Chris Cason at Taiyou Con, 2011

==== ADR voice director ====
- The Asterisk War
- Baki the Grappler
- Baldr Force EXE Resolution
- Bamboo Blade
- Birdy the Mighty: Decode
- Case Closed
- Chrome Shelled Regios
- Dragon Ball series
- The Galaxy Railways
- Kaze no Stigma
- Kodocha
- Mobile Suit Gundam: Iron-Blooded Orphans
- Mob Psycho 100
- Negima!?
- Save Me! Lollipop
- Occultic;Nine
- One-Punch Man
- Re:Zero − Starting Life in Another World
- Mamotte! Lollipop
- School Rumble
- The Seven Deadly Sins
- Tsubasa Tokyo Revelations
- YuYu Hakusho
- Yuki Yuna is a Hero

==== Script writer ====
- AM Driver
- Black Cat
- Case Closed
- Magi: The Labyrinth of Magic
- One Piece
- Suzuka
- Witchblade
- Yuki Yuna is a Hero
