= Otto Gildemeister =

German journalist and translator (1823–1902)

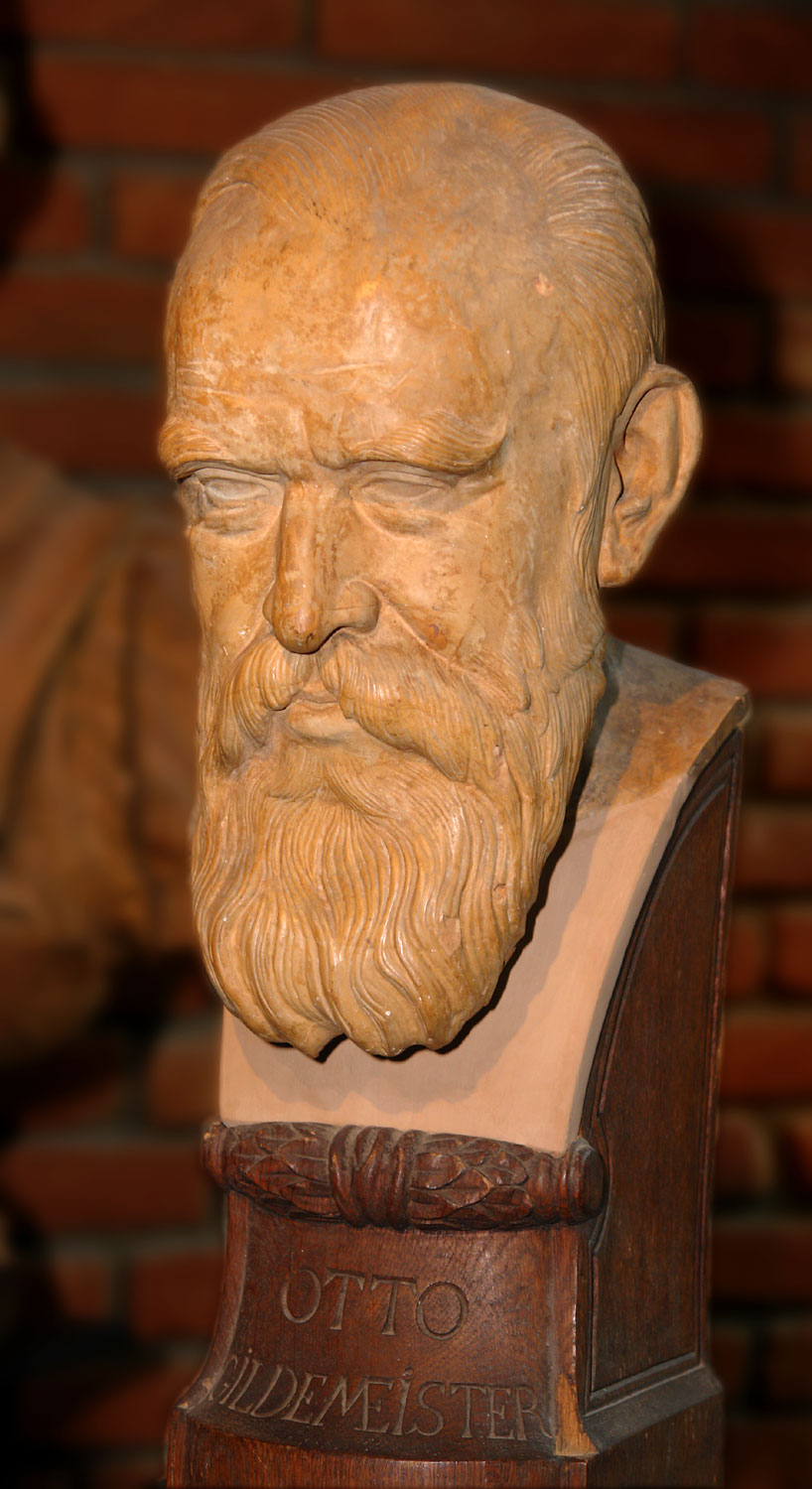
- Bust of Gildemeister at the Focke-Museum in Bremen

Otto Gildemeister (13 March 1823 Bremen - 26 August 1902) was a German journalist and translator.

== Biography ==
In 1850 he became editor-in-chief of the Weser-Zeitung of Bremen. He is known for his German renderings of Byron's complete works (1864–65; 4th ed. 1888); of a number of plays of Shakespeare, including the historical ones, for the Bodenstedt edition; of Shakespeare's Sonnets (1871); Ariosto's Orlando Furioso (4 vols., 1882); and Dante's Divina Commedia (1888; 3d ed. 1900).

== Family ==
He was the brother of German architect Karl Gildemeister.
