= Karl Gildemeister =

German architect

Karl Gildemeister (11 October 1820 – 8 February 1869) was a German architect.

== Life ==
Gildemeister was born in Bremen, where he was first apprenticed to his relative, the Bremen J. E. Polzin. In 1843 he enrolled at the Karlsruhe Polytechnic School, later transferring to the Berliner Bauakademie; there followed study trips to Italy and Greece. In the wake of the revolution of 1848 he emigrated to New York where in collaboration with Georg Carstensen he designed the New York Crystal Palace which was part of the Exhibition of the Industry of All Nations in New York City. His business affected by the Depression of 1857, he returned to Germany, where he taught at the commercial art school in Bremen until his early death there. He is known for his detailed historical study of the Bremen Town Hall and Marketplace.

== Family ==
He was the son of Senator Johann Carl Friedrich Gildemeister; the brother of Mayor Otto Gildemeister, also a translator and journalist; and stepson of the architect Jakob Ephraim Polzin.
