= Exhibition of the Industry of All Nations =

1853 World's Fair in New York City

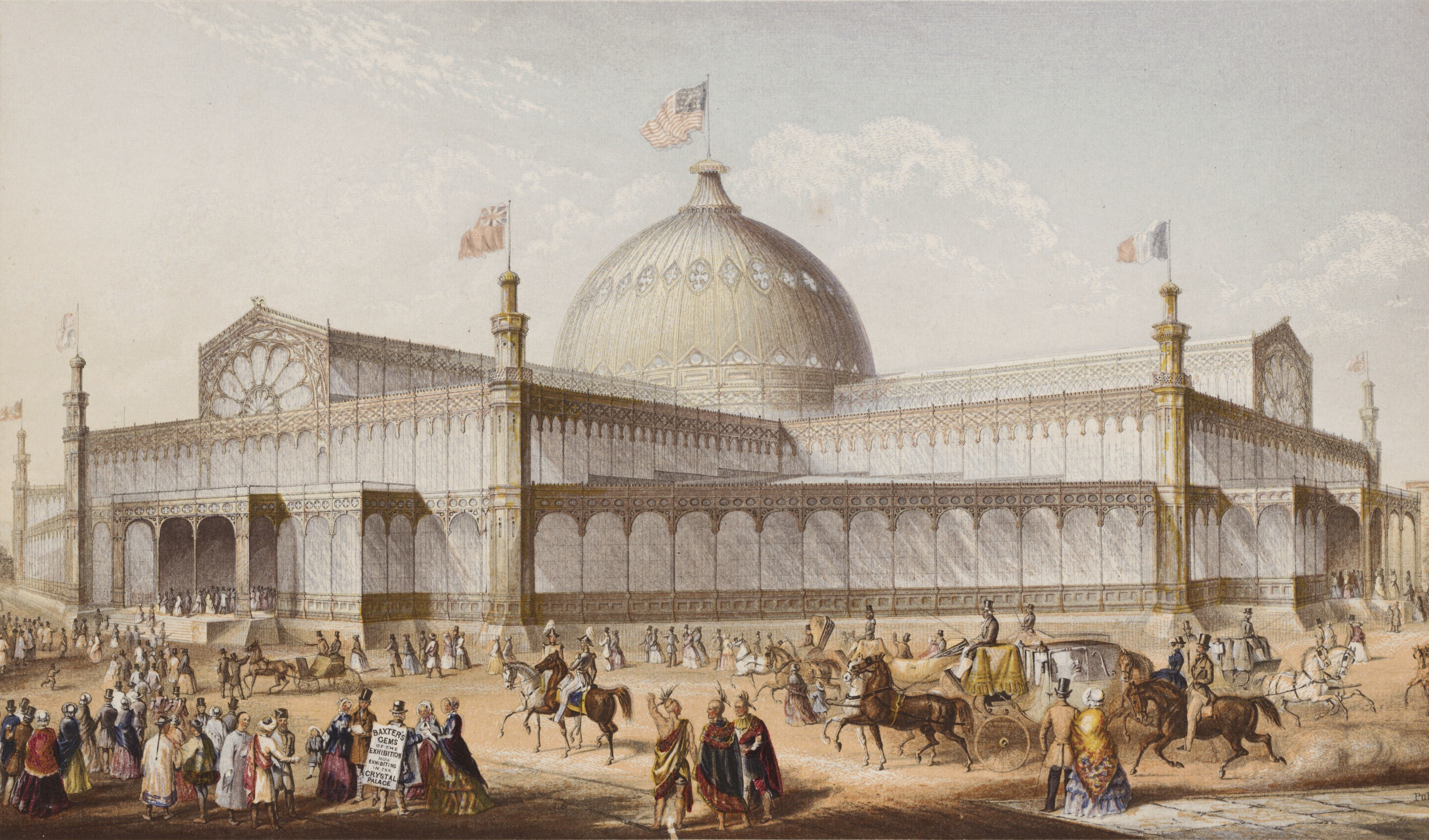
- New York Crystal Palace

Overview
- BIE-class: Unrecognized exposition
- Name: Exhibition of the Industry of All Nations
- Building(s): New York Crystal Palace
- Visitors: over 1.1 million

Location
- Country: United States
- City: New York City
- Venue: Bryant Park
- Coordinates: 40.7538°N 73.9836°W

Timeline
- Opening: July 14, 1853
- Closure: November 14, 1854

The Exhibition of the Industry of All Nations was a World's Fair held in 1853 in what is now Bryant Park in New York City, in the wake of the highly successful 1851 Great Exhibition in London. It aimed to showcase the new industrial achievements of the world and also to demonstrate the nationalistic pride of a relatively young nation and all that she stood for. Jacob Aaron Westervelt, at that time Mayor of New York, was the President of the exhibition-committee. The general superintendent was Admiral Samuel Francis Du Pont.

Opening on July 14, 1853 with newly sworn President Franklin Pierce in attendance, the fair was seen by over 1.1 million visitors before it closed on November 14, 1854. The fair featured its own glass and iron exhibition building – the New York Crystal Palace – directly inspired by London's. The Palace was destroyed by fire on October 5, 1858.

Walt Whitman, an American poet, wrote "The Song of the Exposition":

... a Palace,
Lofter, fairer, ampler than any yet,
Earth's modern wonder, History's Seven out stripping,
High rising tier on tier, with glass and iron facades,
Gladdening the sun and sky - enhued in the cheerfulest hues,
Bronze, lilac, robin's-egg, marine and crimson
Over whose golden roof shall flaunt, beneath thy banner, Freedom.

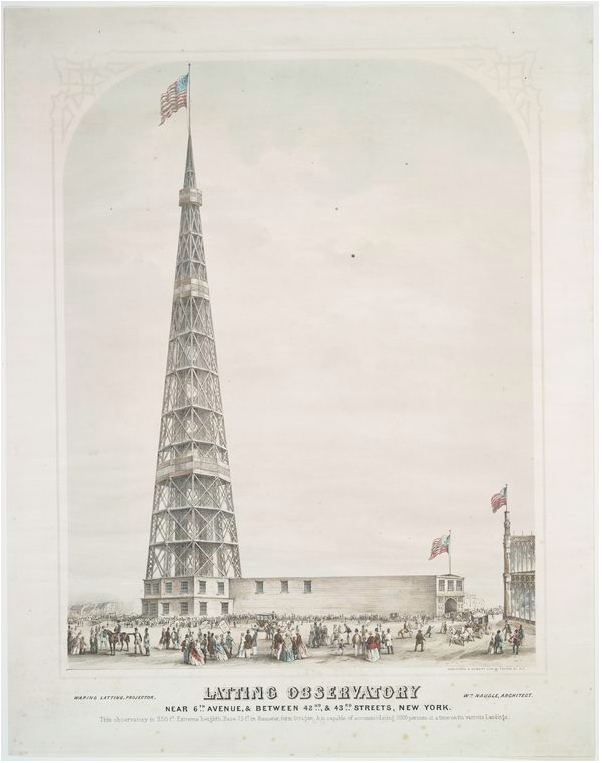
Latting Observatory in 1853.

Adjoining the Crystal Palace was the Latting Observatory, a wooden tower 315 feet (96 m) high, which allowed visitors to see into Queens, Staten Island and New Jersey. The tower, taller than the spire of Trinity Church at 290 feet (88 m), was the tallest structure in New York City from the time it was constructed in 1853 until it burnt down on August 30, 1856.

The exhibition was not financially successful. After a delayed opening due to construction delays, the fair lost $100,000 in its first year. Showman P. T. Barnum was brought in to turn things around, but when the fair closed in November 1854, total losses amounted to $340,000.

Today, the expo is also remembered as the place where Elisha Otis demonstrated an elevator equipped with a device called a safety, which would kick in if the hoisting rope broke. This addressed a major public concern regarding the safety of elevators. Three years later, Otis installed the first passenger elevator in the United States in a New York City store.

== Notable exhibits ==
- Elisha Otis demonstrated an elevator equipped with a device called a safety brake, which revolutionized the industry completely
- David Alter displayed a method to manufacture and purify bromine from salt wells, highly useful in the iron industry
- The world's first pedal quadracycle was shown

== See also ==
- 1939 New York World's Fair – a later World's Fair in New York City
- 1964 New York World's Fair – a later World's Fair in New York City
- List of world expositions
- List of world's fairs
