= New York Crystal Palace =

Former exhibition building in New York City

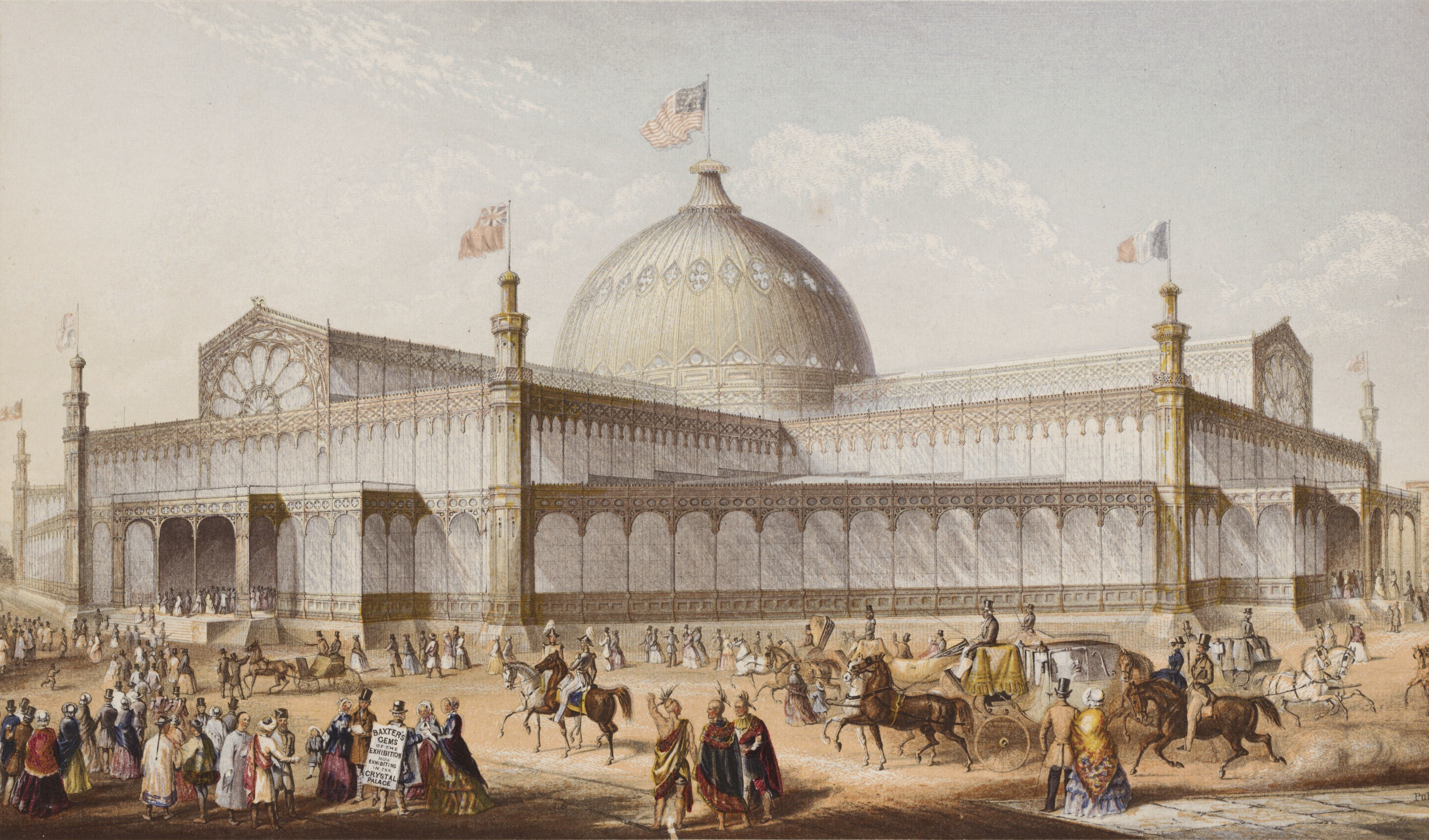
- New York Crystal Palace designed by Karl Gildemeister and Georg Carstensen. The image is an "oil-color" plate by George Baxter, London, dated September 1, 1853

General information
- Status: Destroyed
- Type: Exhibition palace
- Location: New York City, United States of America
- Coordinates: 40°45′13″N 73°59′02″W
- Construction started: 1852
- Inaugurated: July 14, 1853
- Destroyed: October 5, 1858

Design and construction
- Architects: Georg Carstensen and Charles Gildemeister

The New York Crystal Palace was an exhibition building constructed for the Exhibition of the Industry of All Nations in New York City in 1853, which was under the presidency of the mayor Jacob Aaron Westervelt. The building stood on a site behind the Croton Distributing Reservoir in what is now Bryant Park. It was destroyed by fire on October 5, 1858.

== Use in the exhibition ==
New York City's 1853 Exhibition was held on a site behind the Croton Distributing Reservoir, between Fifth and Sixth Avenues on 42nd Street, in what is today Bryant Park in the borough of Manhattan. The New York Crystal Palace was designed by Georg Carstensen and German architect Charles Gildemeister, and was directly inspired by The Crystal Palace built in London's Hyde Park to house the Great Exhibition of 1851. The New York Crystal Palace had the shape of a Greek cross, and was crowned by a dome 100 ft (30 m) in diameter. Like the Crystal Palace of London, it was constructed from iron and glass. Construction was handled by engineer Christian Edward Detmold. Horatio Allen was the consulting engineer, and Edmund Cobb Hurry (1807–1875) was the consulting architect.

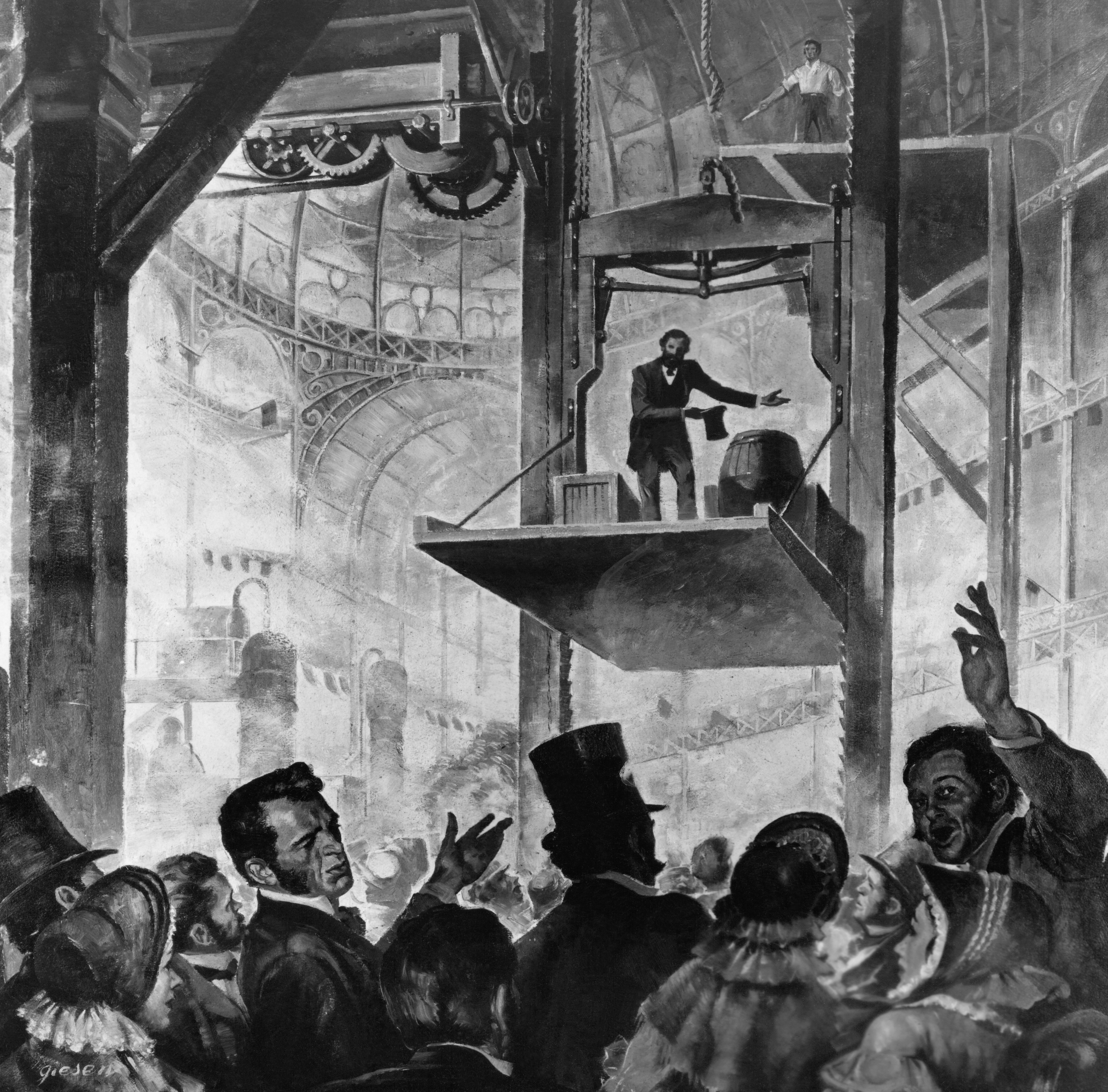
Elisha Otis free-fall safety demonstration in 1853

President Franklin Pierce spoke at the dedication on July 14, 1853. Theodore Sedgwick was the first president of the Crystal Palace Association. After a year, he was succeeded by Phineas T. Barnum who put together a reinauguration in May 1854 when Henry Ward Beecher and Elihu Burritt were the featured orators. This revived interest in the Palace, but by the end of 1856 it was a dead property. Elisha Otis demonstrated the safety elevator, which prevented the fall of the cab if the cable broke, at the Crystal Palace in 1854 in a dramatic presentation. The elevator in the tower was one of the first run by steam power.

== Observatory ==
The adjoining Latting Observatory, a wooden tower 315 feet (96 m) high, allowed visitors to see into Queens to the east, Staten Island to the south, and New Jersey to the west. The tower, taller than the spire of Trinity Church at 290 feet (88 m), was the tallest structure in New York City from the time it was constructed in 1853 until it was shortened in 1855; it burned down in 1856. The Crystal Palace itself barely escaped destruction.

== Destruction ==
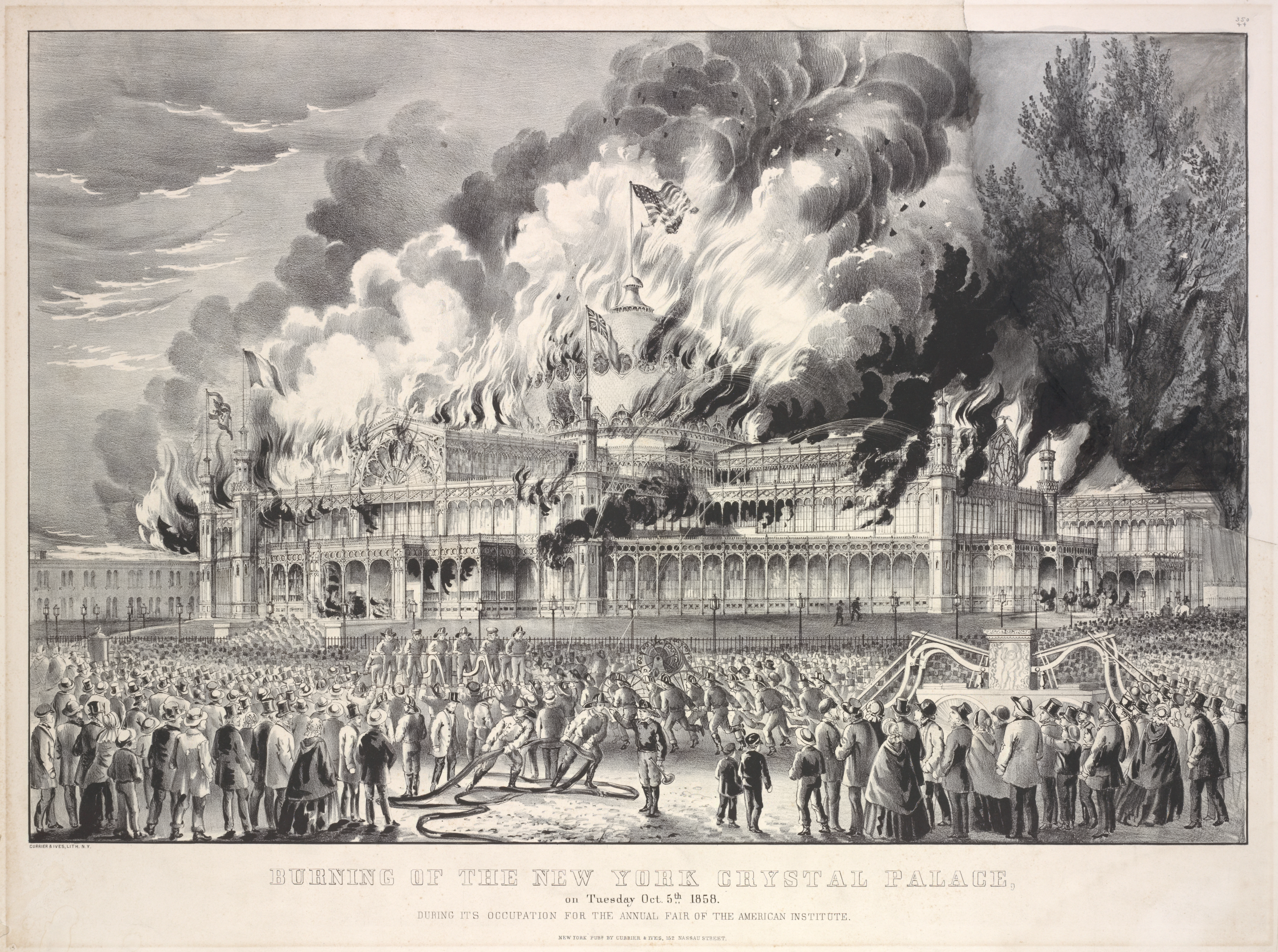
"Burning of the New York Crystal Palace", c. 1858

The New York Crystal Palace was destroyed by fire on October 5, 1858, during the American Institute Fair held there. The fire began in a lumber room on the side adjacent to 42nd Street. Within fifteen minutes its dome fell and in twenty-five minutes the entire structure had burned to the ground. There were no deaths but the loss of property amounted to more than $350,000 (equivalent to $13,024,000 in 2025). This included the building, valued at $125,000 (equivalent to $4,651,000 in 2025), and exhibits and valuable statuary remaining from the World's Fair.
