= Alhambra Copenhagen =

Former entertainment complex

Alhambra (1855–1870)
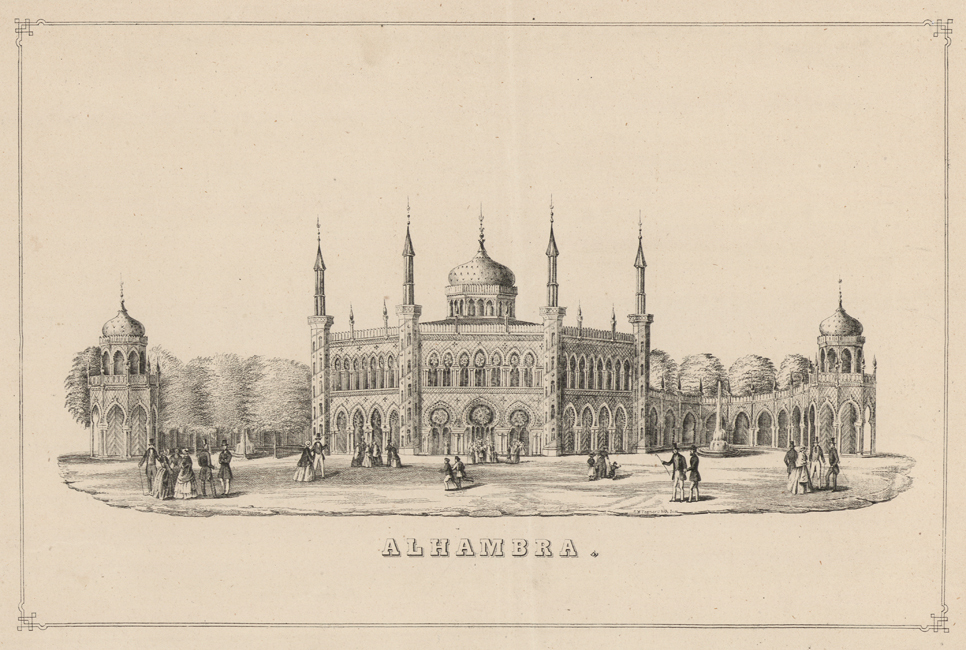

- The Alhambra within Copenhagen

General information
- Type: Concert Hall
- Location: Frederiksberg Allé, Copenhagen, Denmark
- Coordinates: 55.6746°N 12.5444°E
- Opened: 1855
- Closed: 1870
- Demolished: 1870

Design and construction
- Architect: Georg Carstensen

Other information
- Seating capacity: Concerthall: 2,000

Alhambra was a large entertainment-complex, built in 1857 in Frederiksberg, Copenhagen, Denmark.

It was designed by the army-officer Georg Carstensen (1812–1857), who also was one of the developers of the Tivoli Gardens. Following a disagreement with others in the Tivoli Gardens management, Carstensen travelled to the Danish West Indies and joined the army there.

After returning to Denmark in 1855, he attempted to construct an establishment to rival Tivoli Gardens; the Alhambra in Frederiksberg. It was built in a "moorish style" and boasted 2,000 seats with balconies in the big concert hall.

The Alhambra was very popular the first years, but during the winter-times there were almost no activities, since it was impossible to keep this huge hall heated. Also, the lack of proper lighting in the huge surrounding park-area brought along several night-time accidents in the unfinished park. In the end, the venue didn't stand the competition against the established Tivoli Gardens. and had to close down. The buildings were torn down in 1870.

The only reminiscent left of this failed project is a street named Alhambravej.

== Gallery ==
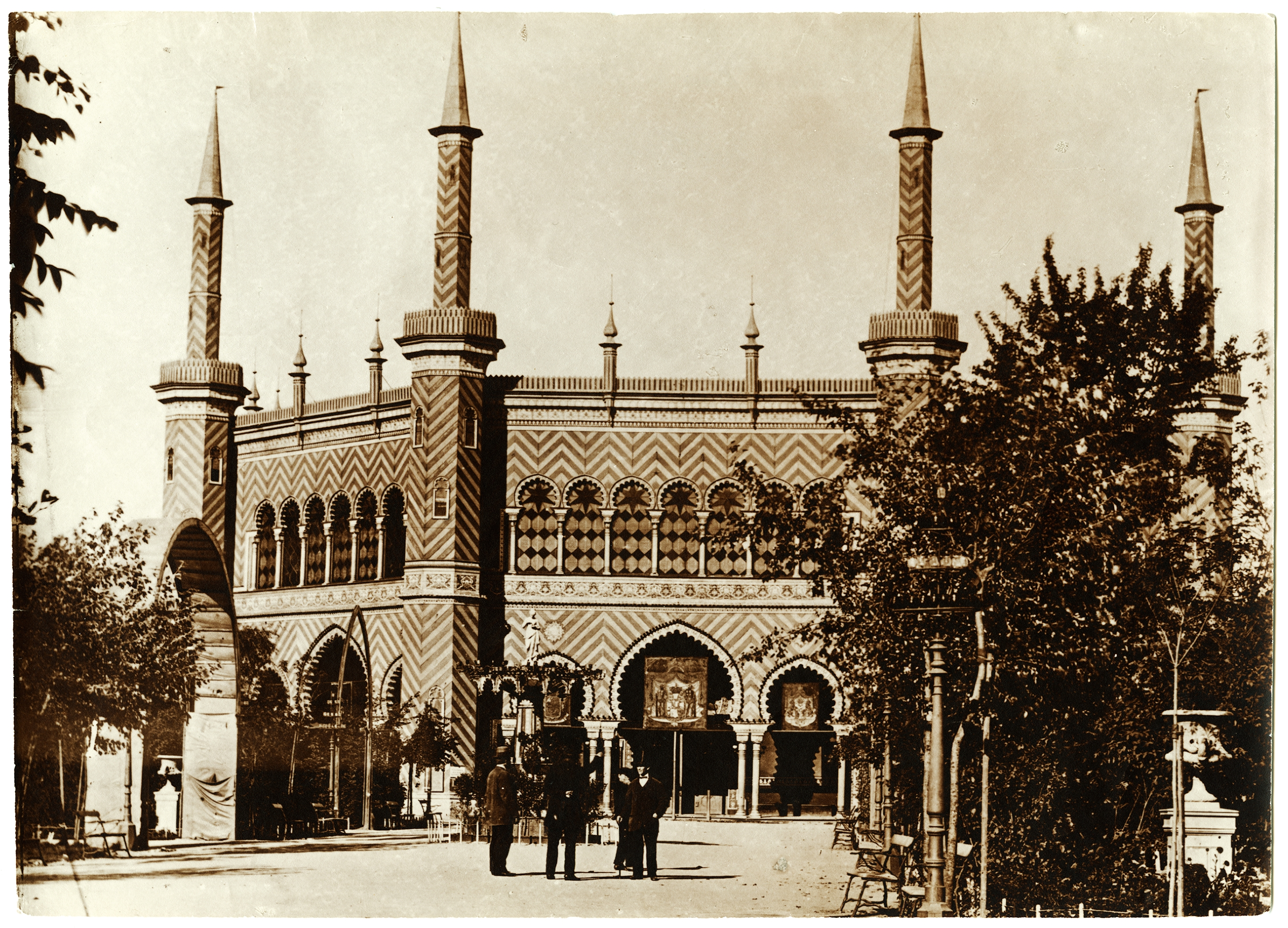
The concert hall in c. 1865.

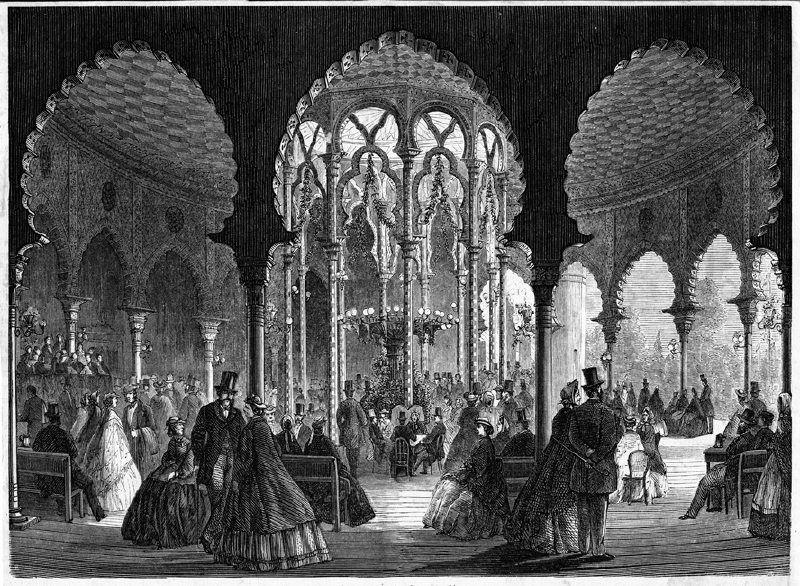
Interior of the concert hall.
