= Henry Detmold =

English painter

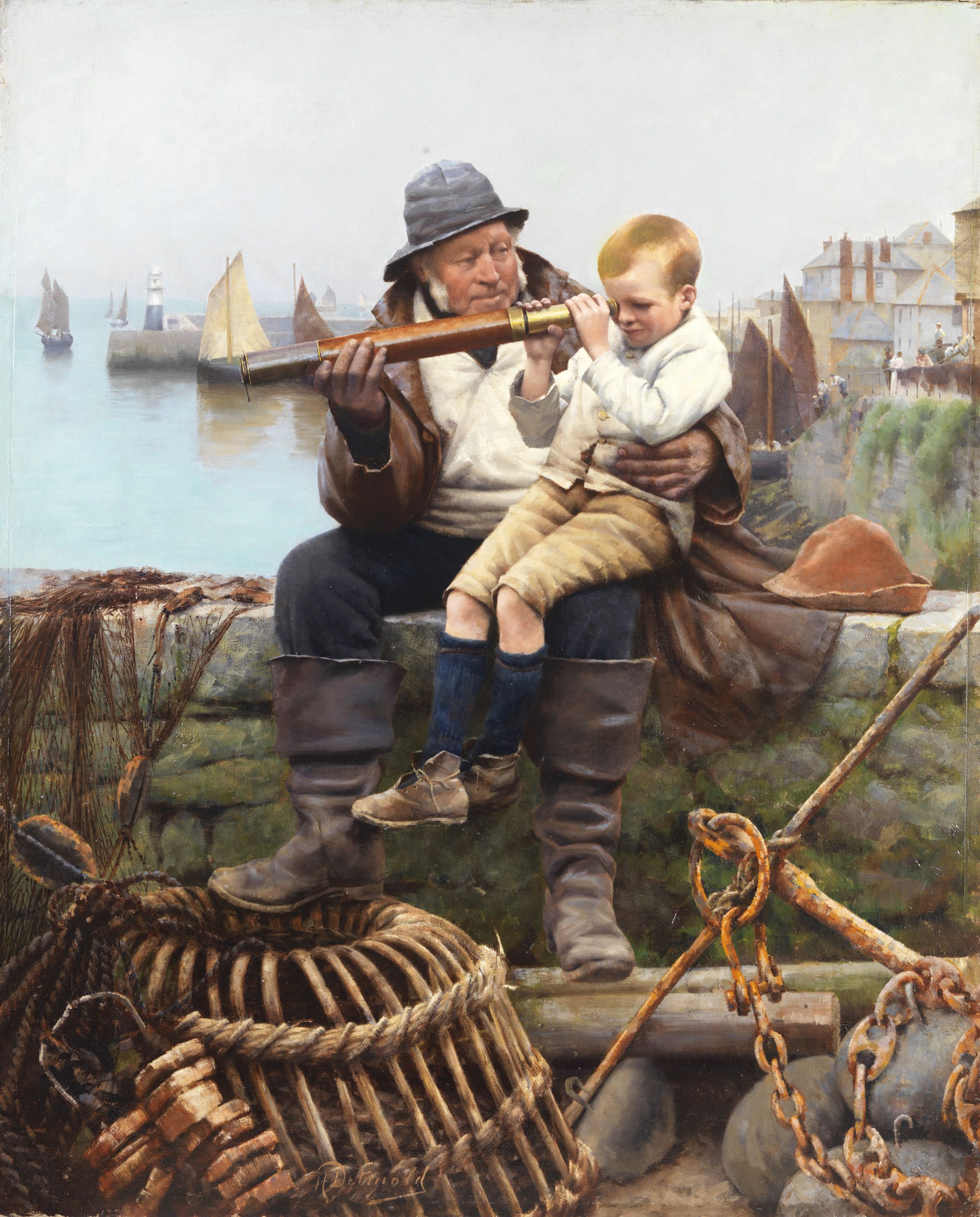

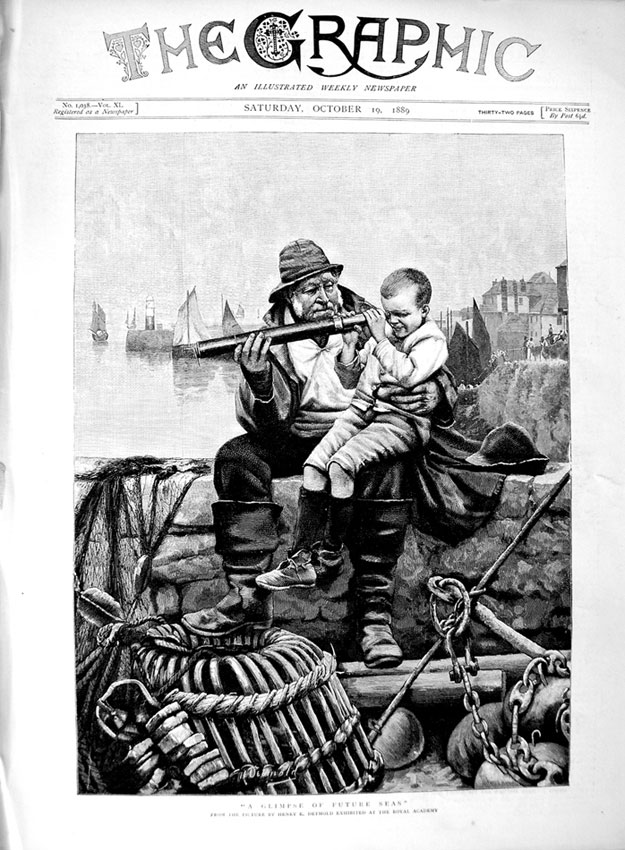

Henry Edward Detmold (4 October 1854, in Surbiton, Kingston upon Thames – 1924, in Paris), born into an affluent merchant family of German origin, was an English painter and illustrator, specialising in landscape, figure and marine painting, and a founder member of the Newlyn School.

He studied at Düsseldorf, Brussels, Munich and in Paris under Carolus Duran. His works were exhibited in London from 1879, and in Paris and he regularly commuted between the two cities between 1881 and 1900. The Newlyn School, to which he belonged, was a group of landscape painters working from the coastal town of Newlyn in Cornwall, some of whom had also spent time on the Continent.

Detmold arrived in Newlyn in 1885. He played in the Newlyn cricket team in matches against St Ives, and in the Artists of West Cornwall XI against Penzance in 1888. With fellow artists he lodged for a while at 7 Bellair Terrace, St Ives.

The scenes he painted were of places he visited in England, France, Cairo and North Africa. He exhibited at the Royal Academy, Royal Society of British Artists, Royal Institute of Oil Painters, Royal Institute of Painters in Water Colours, Grosvenor Gallery, Agnew and Sons Gallery and Dowdeswell Gallery in London, as well as at the Royal Hibernian Academy, Glasgow Institute of the Fine Arts, Royal Society of Artists in Birmingham, Walker Art Gallery in Liverpool and Manchester City Art Gallery, and joined the New English Art Club in 1886. By 1890, he was living in London, married to a Miss Julia Lane who had been born in 1863 in Metz, Moselle in France. They moved to Hastings and St Leonards-on-Sea in about 1892, and by 1900 were living in Paris.

Henry Detmold was an uncle of the Detmold twins and played a large role in their art education. He supplied illustrations for journals and magazines such as The Graphic and was in demand for illustrating books such as "East of Paris" by Matilda Betham-Edwards.

His grave is in the Pere Lachaise cemetery in Paris.
