= Elisha Otis =

19th-century American industrialist and inventor of the Otis Elevator

Elisha Graves Otis
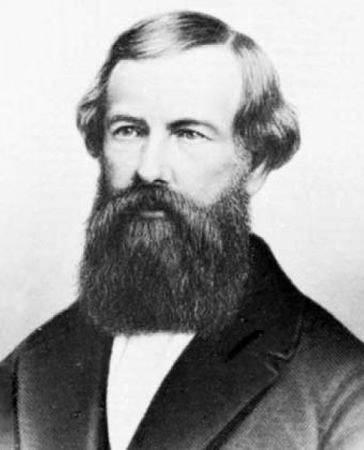
- Elisha Graves Otis
- Born: August 3, 1811; Montpelier, Vermont, United States
- Died: April 8, 1861 (aged 49); Yonkers, New York, United States
- Known for: Founder of the Otis Elevator Company
- Spouses: Susan Houghton (m. 1832; died 1842) Elizabeth Boyd (m. 1845)
- Children: 2, including Norton
- Engineering career
- Projects: Elevators

Elisha Graves Otis (August 3, 1811 – April 8, 1861) was an American industrialist and founder of the Otis Elevator Company. In 1853, he invented a safety device that prevents elevators from falling if the hoisting cable fails. On March 23, 1857, he installed the first safety elevator for passenger service in the store of E.V. Haughwout & Co. in New York City.

== Biography ==
Otis was born on August 3, 1811, in Halifax, Vermont, to Stephen Otis and Phoebe Glynn. He moved away from home at the age of 19, eventually settling in Troy, New York, where he lived for five years employed as a wagon driver. In 1834, he married Susan A. Houghton. They had two children, Charles and Norton. Later that year, Otis suffered a terrible case of pneumonia which nearly killed him, but he earned enough money to move his wife and three-year-old son to the Vermont Hills on the Green River. He designed and built his own gristmill, but did not earn enough money from it, so he converted it into a sawmill, yet still did not attract customers. Now having a second son, Otis started building wagons and carriages, at which he was fairly skilled. His wife died in 1842, leaving him with two sons, one age eight and the other in infancy.

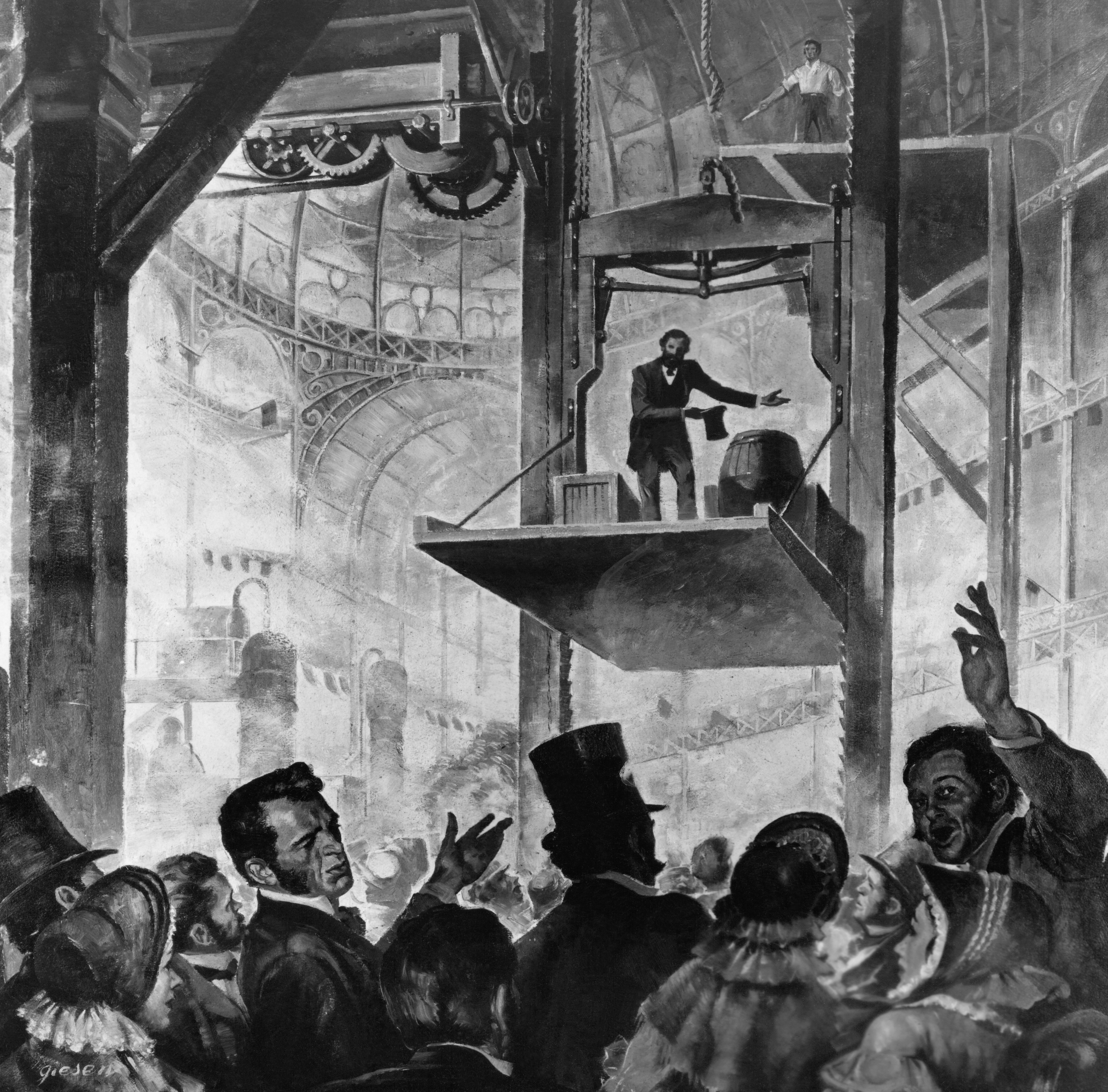
Otis free-fall safety demonstration in 1854

In 1845, Otis married Elizabeth Boyd and moved to Albany, New York. There, he worked as a master mechanic in a bedstead factory and invented an automatic turner to make bed posts four times faster than by hand. In 1848, Otis started his business, Hudson Manufactory, to produce and market his invention. During this period, he also invented a railway safety brake, however the business only lasted two years. By 1852, he had moved to Yonkers, New York to work at the Maize & Burns bedstead factory installing machinery. The factory needed a hoist to lift heavy equipment to the upper floor, but this posed serious safety issues. In response, Otis invented the safety elevator, which automatically comes to a halt if the hoisting rope breaks. The following year, he left the factory and started his own company, the Otis Elevator Company. After giving a public demonstration of his new invention at the New York Crystal Palace in 1854, demand for the safety elevator began to rise. He installed the first safety elevator for passenger service at the E. V. Haughwout Building in New York City in 1857.

In his spare time, Otis designed and experimented with his old designs of bread-baking ovens and train brakes, and patented a steam plow in 1857, a rotary oven in 1858, and, with Charles, the oscillating steam engine in 1860. The plow was not commercially successful.

Otis contracted diphtheria and died on April 8, 1861; he was 49 years old. He was buried in Oakland Cemetery in Yonkers, New York.

== Legacy ==
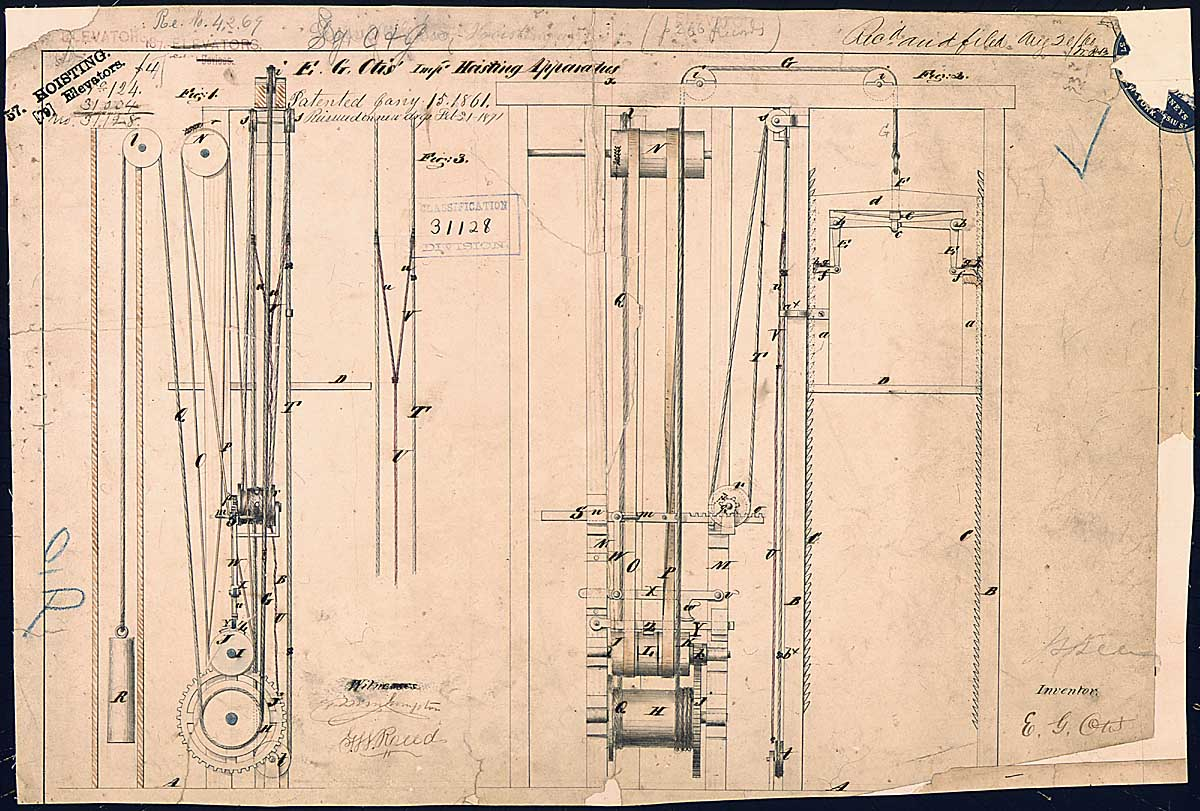
Otis Elevator Patent

An Otis Elevator Company worker coined the term "escalator" to refer to continuous-loop moving staircases that could either ascend or descend. The company was acquired by United Technologies in 1976. In April 2020, Otis Elevators Company was spun off from United technology to be an independent elevator company.

The World War II U.S. Liberty ship SS Elisha Graves Otis was named after him.
