= Edward Barton Shuldham =

British physician and homeopath (1837–1924)

Edward Barton Shuldham MRCS (3 July 1837 – 22 January 1924) was a British physician who eventually converted to homeopathy. He was a physician at the St. James Homeopathic Hospital, a member of the British Homeopathic Society, and an editor of The Homeopathic World.

== Early life ==
Shuldham was born in 1837 in Nusseerabad, Bengal, the second son to Thomas Henry Shuldham and Frances Anne Hamilton, who were married in Winchester in 1834. He had an older brother, (John) Henry Shuldham, born in 1835, before their parents moved to India, where his father was a captain in 52nd Regiment of the Bengal Native Infantry.

His parents' marriage soon ended bitterly in a scandalous divorce case heard in the House of Lords, that required a commission sent to India to investigate. After his mother became sick, his father moved her and the two boys to a different climate in March 1838 in Mount Abu—a popular retreat from the heat—before returning to his base, some 15 days away. After the elder child, Henry, became ill, their father made arrangements to send his family back to England while he stayed behind. However, for some reason, his mother sent Edward and his nurse back to Nusseerabad, and departed for England with another British couple. She stopped in Cape Town, South Africa, where they planned to stay for the winter before continuing on to England. She met a Major Downing of the British Indian Army. Instead of continuing her journey back to England, she returned to Bombay and lived out of wedlock with Downing in the Nilgiri mountains, where she pretended to be his sister. She became pregnant and had another baby in March 1840. While she admitted that she was unfaithful, she accused her husband of mistreating her and neglecting her. The Lords were not sympathetic to Mrs. Shuldham.

== Career ==
Shuldham graduated from Trinity College, Dublin.

Among Shuldham's friends was Lewis Carroll, a homeopath and a stammerer, both matters that were of great interest to Shuldham. He was uncle and guardian to the twin artist prodigies, Edward Julius Detmold and Charles Maurice Detmold, nurturing their interest in art and natural history, and in 1899 helping to produce their first book Pictures From Birdland, with 24 of their chromolithographic plates of exotic birds, and accompanying verses by Shuldham.

He was the author of numerous books on health topics including The family homoeopathist, Headaches: their causes and treatment, The health of the skin, Coughs and their cure, Stammering and its rational treatment, Clergyman's sore throat, or follicular disease of the pharynx, and contributed case histories and articles to homeopathic publications. He died aged 86 in Hampstead, London in early 1924.
