= Fabre's Book of Insects =

Non-fiction book

- Author: Jean-Henri Fabre
- Genre: Insects
- Publication date: 1998

Fabre's Book of Insects is a non-fiction book that is a retelling of Alexander Teixeira de Mattos' translation of Jean-Henri Fabre's Souvenirs entomologiques. It was retold by Mrs. Rodolph Stawell and illustrated by Edward Detmold. It talks about insects in real life, mythology and folklore.

== Reception ==
A Times Higher Education review says, "It was Fabre's Book of Insects, extracts from that extraordinary man's Souvenirs entomologiques, "retold" – and with an exemplary clarity and simplicity which made me feel enlisted and embraced but never patronised – by a Mrs Rudolph Stawell. Years later I read the full Souvenirs themselves and wondered why I had not done so long before, as soon as I could read French. The magic is Fabre's own, not imported by Mrs Stawell." It was reviewed by The New York Times.
