= The Day Book =

Chicago newspaper (1911–1917)

The Day Book was an experimental, advertising-free daily newspaper published in Chicago from 1911 to 1917. It was owned by E. W. Scripps as part of the Scripps-McRae League of Newspapers (later Scripps-Howard Newspapers). Its editor was Negley D. Cochran, previously of The Toledo News-Bee. It was printed in tabloid size to save costs.

== History ==
With the Day Book, Scripps sought to eliminate the often adversarial relationship between his editorial staffs and the advertisers that sustained them. To his disappointment, pressure from the business community had at times forced the Cincinnati Post to temper its firebrand campaigns against bossism and cronyism. Inspired by Charles Anderson Dana's unsuccessful push to eliminate advertising at the New York Sun, Scripps instituted policies at his papers that limited the size of advertisements and discouraged the full page spreads preferred by department stores. In 1904, he outlined a plan for a newspaper chain, starting in Chicago, that relied entirely on subscription fees and sales.

The Day Book began publishing on September 28, 1911. Like his other penny presses, the Day Book championed labor rights while delivering a mix of politics and lowbrow, sensational content. Circulation peaked at 22,839 in October 1916. During the Chicago Newspaper strike of 1912, when several of the city's major newspapers were crippled after locking out pressmen, circulation of the Day Book rose, though it fell once the strike ended.

The Day Book published its last edition on July 6, 1917. It had turned a profit only one month since its founding, in January 1917. It fell short of the estimated 30,000 subscribers needed to become self-sustaining and far short of the 15% profit Scripps expected of his papers.

The Day Book was digitized by the Illinois Newspaper Project. Archived issues can be found at the Chronicling America website.

== Notable contributors ==
A.D. Condo drew about 400 installations of Mr. Skygack, from Mars, the first science fiction comic, which was syndicated nationally, in addition to his other strip The Outbursts of Everett True. Donald S. Day later became famous for his work as a Nazi propagandist. Some 135 articles are attributed to reporter Carl Sandburg, who would become a celebrated poet after leaving the paper.

== See also ==
- PM (newspaper)
