= Public transit etiquette in the United States =

Formal and informal rules for commuters

Public transit etiquette in the United States refers to the formal and informal rules that influence commuter behavior on trains, buses, and other forms of public transportation. While some practices of etiquette are enforced by transit agencies such as rules against eating and drinking, many are unspoken rules like keeping noise to a minimum. Many transit agencies throughout the United States, such as the MBTA and MTA, have launched campaigns to encourage etiquette practices, addressing issues like fare-evasion, manspreading, and priority seating. The COVID-19 pandemic introduced new etiquette expectations like social distancing. Despite these efforts, many challenges remain in enforcement of rules and expectations.

== Common practices ==
Rules and norms govern a range of commuter behavior including the management of space, sounds, smells, and seating.

Riders are expected to be mindful of the space they take. Practices such as taking backpacks off and placing them on the floor next to the commuter are encouraged. Similarly, commuters are expected to keep noise to a minimum. Not speaking loudly on the phone, or not speaking on the phone at all is seen as respectful to other commuters. Wearing headphones during commutes and not playing the sound from a phone or speaker is encouraged. Speaking with bus drivers for long periods of time is also viewed as disrespectful or dangerous. Strong odors are discouraged. Some rules forbid eating on public transportation as to avoid strong smells and litter.

These expectations are largely social norms rather than formal rules. While governments and transit agencies may not fine enforce these practices, commuters often regulate through civil inattention. While many transit systems such as the MBTA have regulated seating called "Priority Seating", it is not protected under all US transit services like MARTA. Despite the written rule, there is a norm to give up your seat for people with disabilities, the elderly, and pregnant women.

Users are required to pay fares. In 2014, 48% of New York MTA bus riders boarded without paying the fare everyday, which is more than double the percentage during the COVID-19 pandemic. In Boston, the MBTA attempts to prevent fare evasion by issuing warnings and fines of $50-$150.

== Courtesy campaigns ==
In 2014, the MTA launched their "Courtesy Counts" campaign. The campaign was divided in to two categories of behaviors: "Do's" and No No's". Some of the "Do's" consisted of a commuter giving up their seat for a pregnant person and taking off backpacks. Some of the "No No's" consisted of avoiding manspreading, eating on the subway, and dancing.

In May 2017, the MTA launched a campaign offering commuters with accessibility needs Oreo-cookie sized buttons that show need for a seat. One of the buttons has written "BABY ON BOARD! Courtesy counts" and the other says "Please offer me a seat". The buttons can be requested online. By September 2017, the MTA has distributed over 21,500 buttons. However, many commuters who used the button said that it did not incentive others to give up their seat.

== COVID-19 response ==
According to UCLA's Institute of Transportation Studies, the COVID-19 pandemic caused a dramatic decrease of commuters using public transportation. In response to COVID-19, major cities in America placed requirements for commuters to use rear doors in order to limit the exposure between bus drivers and passengers. During the pandemic, major cities and fellow commuters attempted to reinforce social distancing. While many cities recognized that it would be difficult to enforce a standard on public transportation, it was generally advice to keep a "healthy distance".
