= Manspreading =

Practice of sitting in public transport with legs wide apart

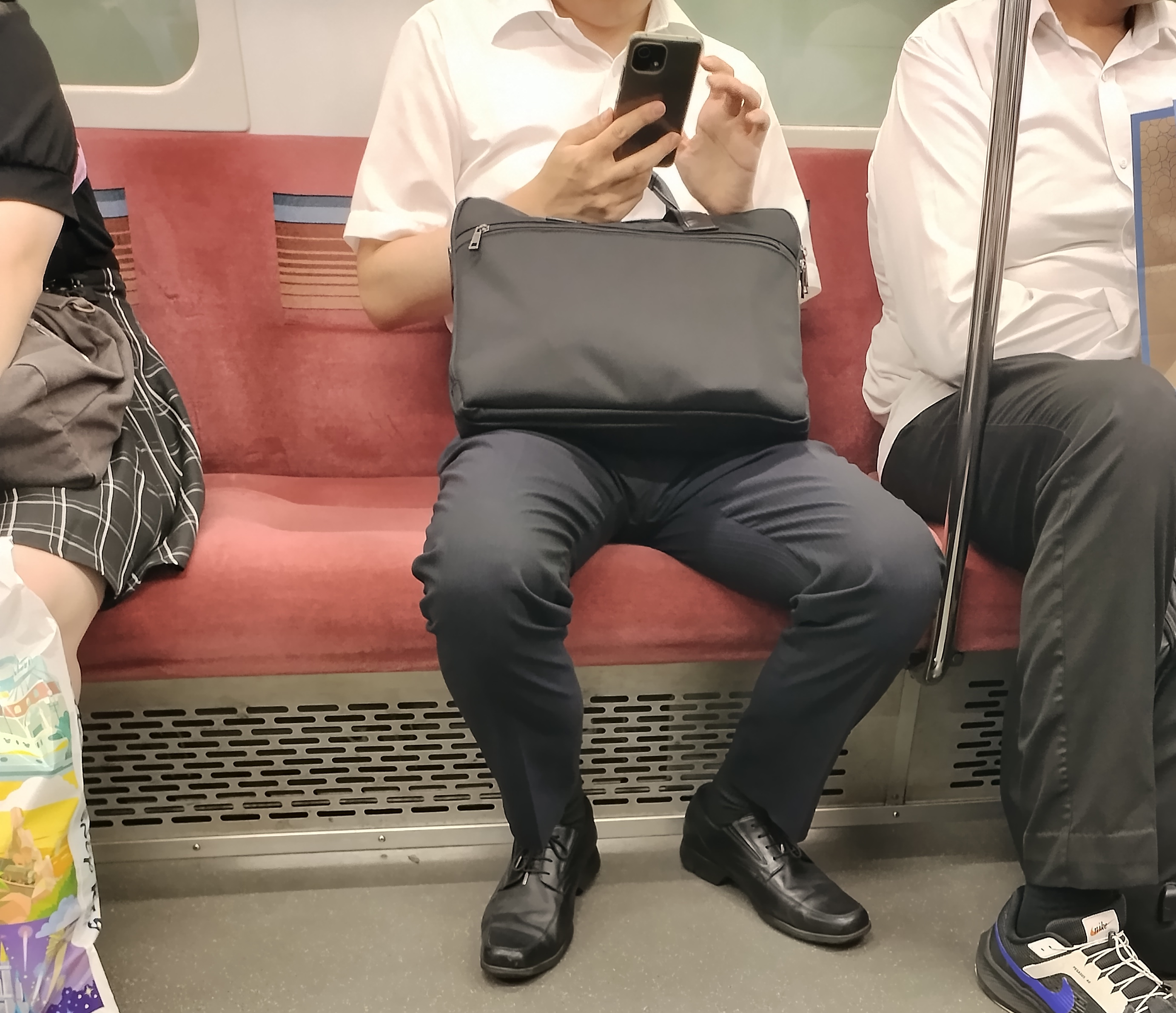
An example of "manspreading" on the Tokyo Metro Tozai Line

"Manspreading" or "man-sitting" is a neologism referring to the practice of some men sitting in public transport with legs wide apart, thereby covering more than one seat.

A public debate began when an anti-manspreading campaign started on the social media website Tumblr in 2013; The term appeared a year later. These campaigns have been heavily criticised as public shaming campaigns, as the subjects are often clearly identifiable, and the associated practice of taking non-consensual photos of men with emphasis on their crotch has been compared to creepshots or revenge porn.

The usage of the term has received substantial criticism from both feminists and antifeminists. In the United States, law enforcement regarding manspreading has unduly targeted Latino men.

The dictionary website Lexico added the word "manspreading" in August 2015. Lyndsay Kirkham, an English professor at Humber College in Toronto, said the practice is a metaphor for the permission men were given to take up a disproportionate share of space in society.

== Explanations ==
=== Physiology ===
There is no scientific study explaining the physiology of this phenomenon. Author and fitness journalist Lou Schuler speculates that "manspreading" is natural due to men's inherent physical differences which make spreading knees the "least-stressed sitting position for men":

Here's what happens when someone like me sits with my knees close together: The round ball at the top of the femur will pinch against the outside edge of the acetabulum (the hip socket), straining the labrum that lines the socket. To get into that position, I have to activate the adductor muscles on my inner thighs. That automatically triggers resistance from the abductor muscles on my outer thighs, creating tension that can reach all the way up into the lower back. The second I release the contraction, my thighs spring apart, leaving a gap of about 15 inches from the center of each kneecap, more than three-quarters of the distance to a proper manspread ... Women, on the other hand, have a wider pelvis and thighbones that more naturally angle in toward the body's midline, rather than away from it. Sitting with the knees close together is a stress-free position most of the time, although that changes during pregnancy, when the weight of the belly pushes the knees out.

The male anatomy typically has a higher center of mass, partially due to increased shoulder and upper arm musculature and partially due to lessened fat deposits on the thighs and buttocks. Men with long torsos also have a longer pendulum arm, which amplifies lateral forces due to motion of the vehicle. Men on average also have narrower backsides than women, providing a less secure base. If the chair offers lateral lumbar support, this can help to alleviate swaying, but much public transportation features spartan seating design, and spreading the legs to increase the base of support is the natural option to maintain a secure posture.

Larger men with broad shoulders are often as wide at the shoulder (or wider) than the seat provided; there is often very little tolerance for swaying sideways without contacting the person in the adjacent seat, especially for larger men seated side by side. Men can reduce their shoulder width somewhat by curling the shoulders forward and sitting with their forearms crossed over their horizontal thighs, an upper body posture akin to man-unspreading.

Manspreading could also be due to the factors such as the overall width of the pelvis, which is relatively greater in females and the angle of the femoral neck, which is more acute.

=== Sociology ===
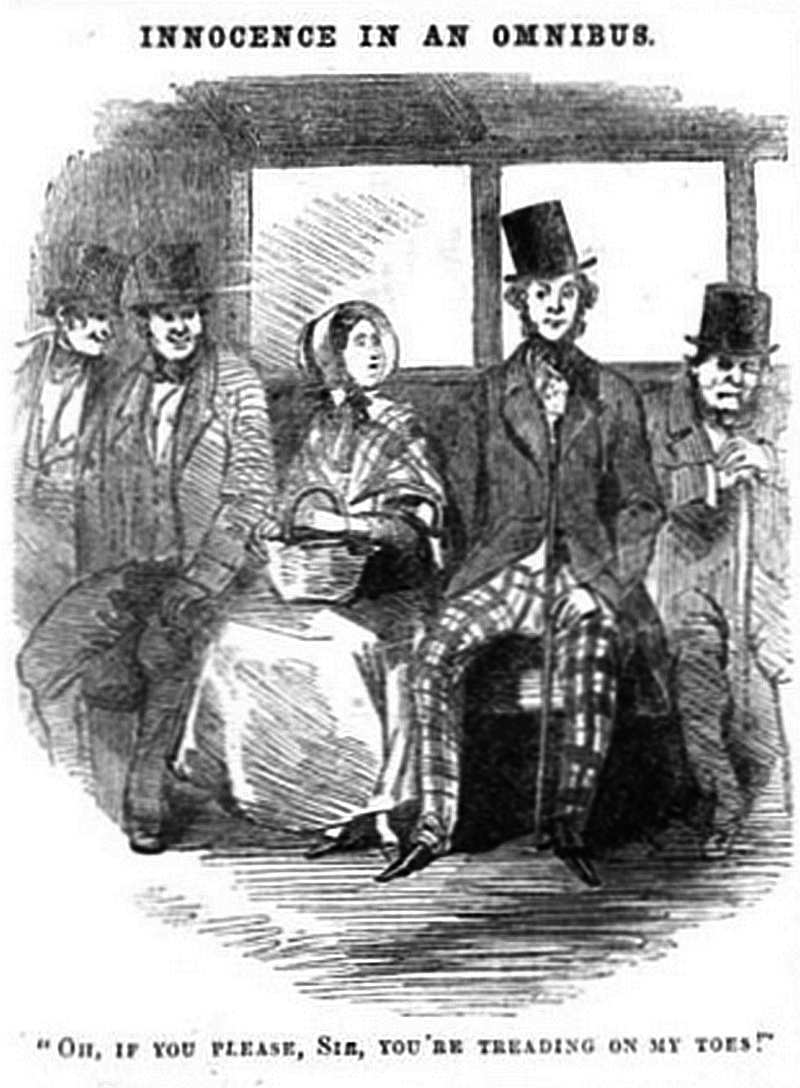
A cartoon from The Puppet-Show (26 March 1848)

Sitting more expansively may also signal dominance and sexual attractiveness for males. In 2016, Tanya Vacharkulksemsuk, a UC Berkeley post-doctorate researcher, published studies that found spreading out legs and arms is more sexually attractive when males do it. Using photographs, she found that images of men spreading out got 87% of interest among female viewers. Expansive poses were not as effective for women, who appeared "vulnerable" and "starfish-like" according to other researchers. On the other hand, some analysts have found that women sitting cross-legged may be perceived positively as an expression of femininity. The opposite seating posture to manspreading, leg-crossing, is often viewed as effeminate.

== Usage in transport ==
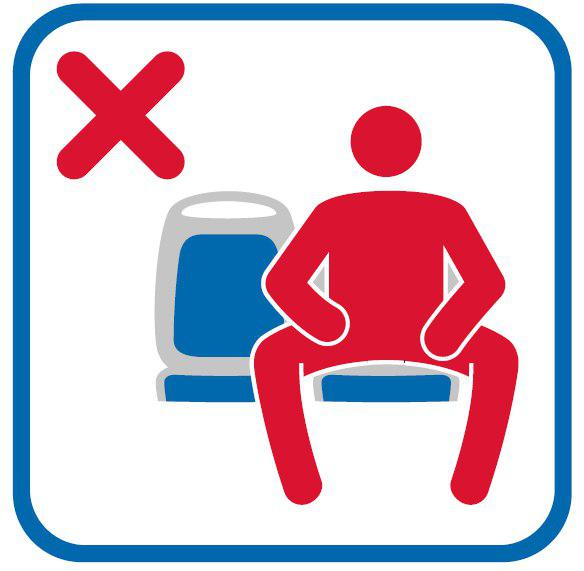
Campaign encouraging respectful posture by Madrid Municipal Transport Company in 2017.

In 2014, the Metropolitan Transportation Authority (MTA) in the New York metropolitan area and Sound Transit of Seattle instituted poster campaigns encouraging respectful posture when other passengers have to stand due to crowding on buses and trains. The MTA campaign, which criticized many behaviors such as leaning on poles and applying makeup, used the slogan "Dude, stop the spread please!" Transport officials in Philadelphia, Chicago and Washington D.C. did not note complaints against manspreading in particular, although the Philadelphia Transportation Authority at that time had an etiquette campaign with the slogan "Dude It's Rude... Two Seats — Really?" aimed at people who occupied seats with bags. Despite social media pressure and public debate to extend the campaign to the Canadian city of Toronto a representative of the Toronto Transit Commission stated "We're not commenting on the manspreading campaign," and she reminded the users to be courteous to each other, allowing someone else to take an empty seat beside them. Since 2017, taking more than one seat is forbidden by EMT Madrid. In some cases, people who find manspreading offensive have taken to photographing manspreading, and posting those images on the Internet.

The term came into controversy after laws against manspreading were used to unduly target the Latino population. Two Latino men were arrested for "manspreading" under the MTA rules, and a teenager was allegedly charged after keeping a backpack next to him. HuffPost called it an example of "broken windows" policing.

== Criticism and controversy ==
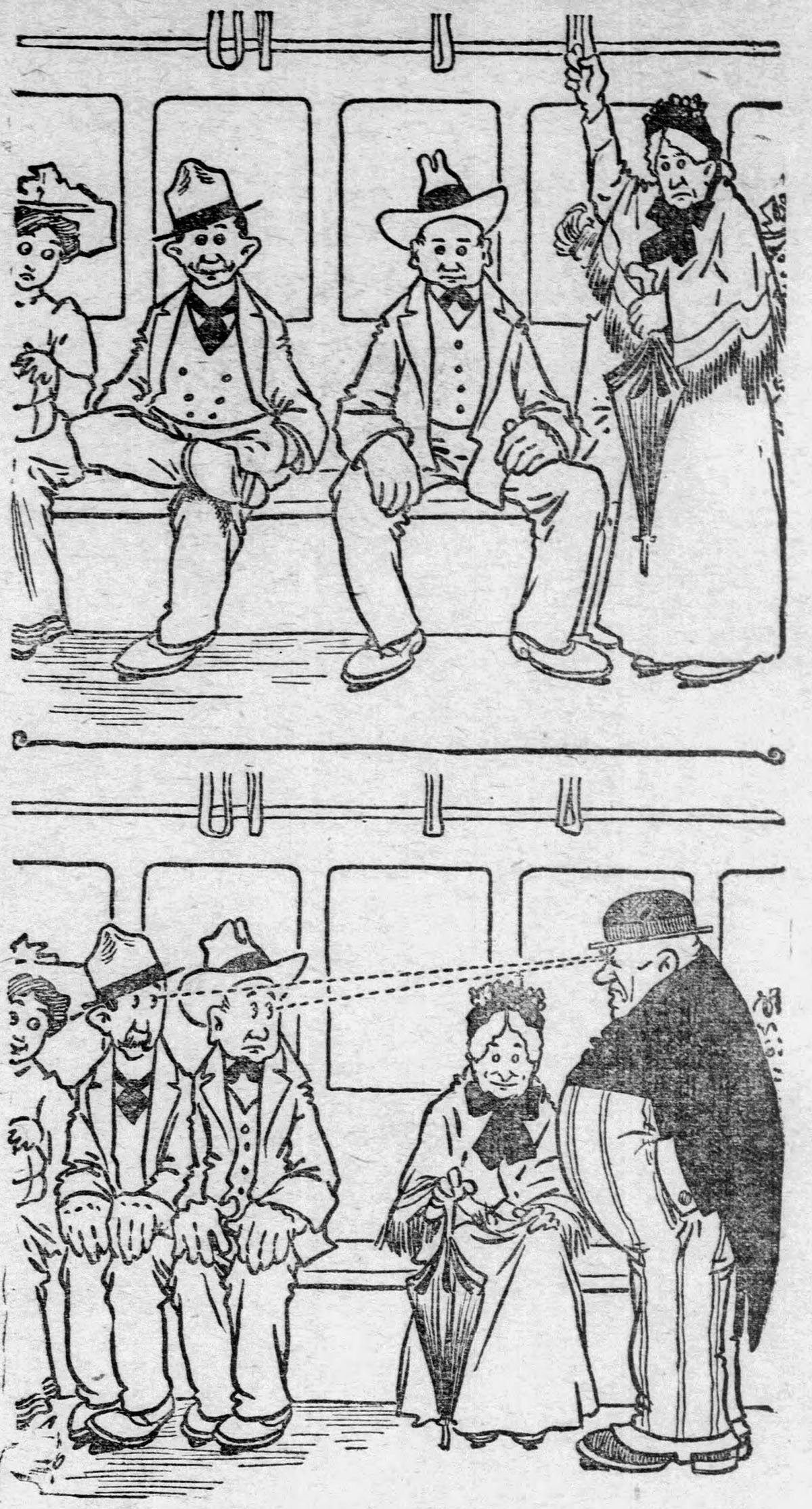
The Outbursts of Everett True, (A. D. Condo, 1907)

Both this posture and the use of the neologism "manspreading" have occasioned some Internet criticism and debates in the US, UK, Turkey, and Canada. The controversy surrounding manspreading has been described by equity feminist writer Cathy Young as "pseudo feminism – preoccupied with male misbehavior, no matter how trivial". She argued that the usage of the term is "about shaming directed at males".

According to University of New South Wales professor and academic Emma Jane, "A key component of activism in this domain has involved feminists taking candid photographs of male commuters engaged in manspreading and posting these images on social media platforms such as Twitter, Instagram, and Tumblr. Many of the male subjects are identifiable and appear alongside mocking captions and comments." The criticism and campaigns against manspreading have been counter-criticized for not addressing similar behavior by women. Men's rights groups have taken issue at the gendered nature of the term, and have contended that anti-social behavior in transport is an issue of individual etiquette rather than gender, pointing to instances of women taking up more than one seat by keeping bags on them, a practice dubbed "she-bagging". The practice of taking non-consensual photos of men with emphasis on their crotch has been compared to creepshots or revenge porn.

The practice has also been described as a form of public shaming. As an example, in New York, actor Tom Hanks was photographed on the subway, taking up two seats and criticized for it. He responded on a talk show, "Hey Internet, you idiot! The train was half empty! It was scattered – there was plenty of room!"

The Canadian Association for Equality (CAFE), a Canadian men's rights group, has been critical of campaigns against manspreading by transit authorities. The CAFE has argued that it is "physically painful for men to close their legs" and that campaigns against manspreading is comparable to "[forcing] women to stop breastfeeding on buses or trains...." Commentators in media have made similar arguments regarding the need for men to spread their legs to properly accommodate their testicles. Peter Post, the author of the book "Essential Manners for Men", has been cited as saying that the proper way for men to sit is with their legs parallel rather than in a V-shape.

In 2016, the word appeared on Lake Superior State University's list of "banished" words and phrases. In 2019, two women received criticism for a "womanspreading" banner that they displayed on a feminist march in Pakistan.

In 2019, Laila Laurel, a student of the University of Brighton, created a chair which was designed to encourage men to sit with their legs closed; she also made a different chair designed to encourage women to sit while taking up a larger portion of space. These chairs received criticism online, with some deeming the chairs and the student misandristic. Her chairs won the Belmond Award, an award at a showcase of work from various universities. According to Laurel, the chairs' designs were not meant to be taken too seriously.

The practice of manspreading itself has also been criticized, generally for taking up too much space. It has also been viewed as a result of gender bias. Certain measures against manspreading have been praised, with some wanting other cities to adopt similar measures. It has been described by journalist Barbara Ellen in 2013 as "essentially anger at the space these men feel entitled to take up." She also argued against the argument that men need to spread their legs by arguing that "Judging by the number of men who manage to sit perfectly normally, there seems to be a modicum of delusional bragging going on here." Finally, she expressed concern that manspreading could lead to more serious behavior towards women.

== See also ==
- Manterrupting
- Mansplaining
- Sociolinguistics
