= Cosplay =

Type of performance art

External videos
- A cinéma vérité view of participants in the 2017 Japan Ultra

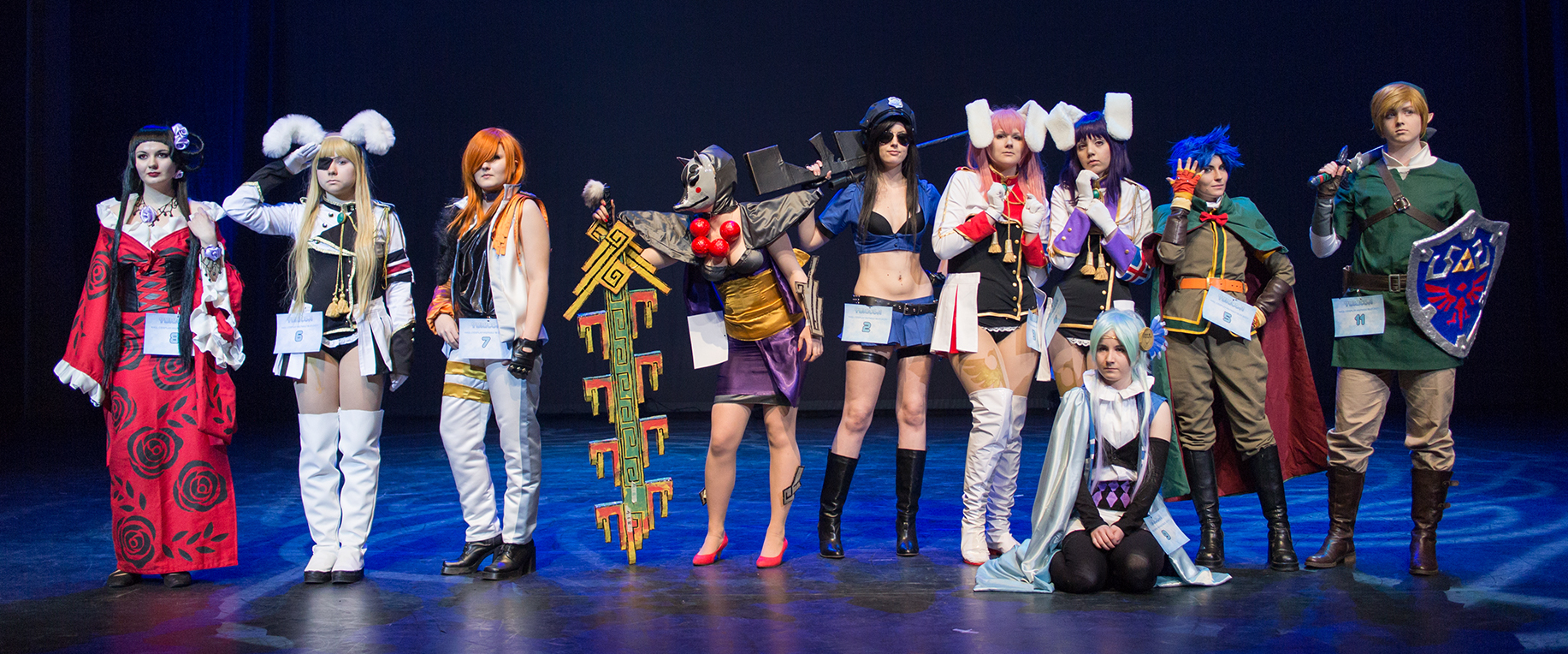
Cosplayers at Yukicon 2014, a fan convention in Finland

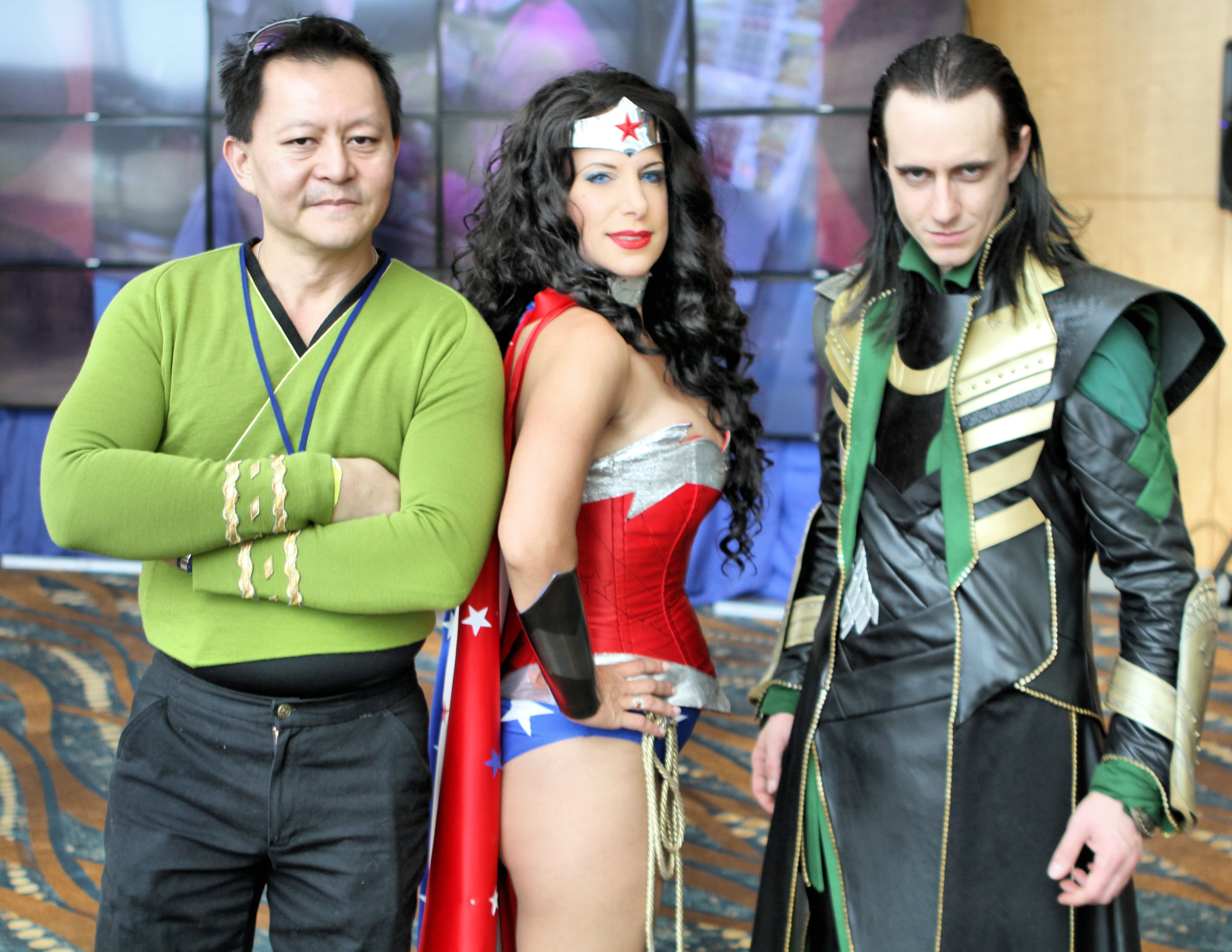
Three cosplayers at the Comic Con in Long Beach 2014, representing James T. Kirk (Star Trek), the superheroine Wonder Woman (DC Universe), and supervillain Loki (Marvel Universe)

A cosplay (a portmanteau of "costume play") is the activity and performance art in which participants called cosplayers wear costumes and fashion accessories to represent a specific character. Cosplayers often interact to create a subculture, and a broader use of the term "cosplay" applies to any costumed role-playing in venues apart from the stage. Any entity that lends itself to dramatic interpretation may be taken up as a subject. Favorite sources include anime, cartoons, manga, comic books, television series, musical artists, video games, memes, and in some cases, original characters. The term has been adopted as slang, often in politics, to mean someone pretending to play a role or take on a personality disingenuously.

Cosplay grew out of the practice of fan costuming at science fiction conventions, beginning with Morojo's "futuristicostumes" created for the 1st World Science Fiction Convention held in New York City, United States, in 1939. The Japanese term "cosplay" (コスプレ, kosupure) was coined in 1983. A rapid growth in the number of people cosplaying as a hobby since the 1990s has made the phenomenon a significant aspect of popular culture in Japan, as well as in other parts of East Asia and in the Western world. Cosplay events are common features of fan conventions, and today there are many dedicated conventions and competitions, as well as social networks, websites, and other forms of media centered on cosplay activities. Cosplay is very popular among all genders, and it is not unusual to see crossplay, also referred to as gender-bending.

== Etymology ==
The term "cosplay" is a Japanese blend word of the English terms costume and play. The term was coined by Nobuyuki Takahashi of Studio Hard in an article for the Japanese magazine My Anime in June 1983. Takahashi decided to coin a new word rather than use the existing translation of the English term "masquerade" because it implied nobility and was old-fashioned. The coinage reflects a common Japanese method of abbreviation in which the first two moras of a pair of words are used to form an independent compound: 'costume' becomes kosu (コス) and 'play' becomes pure (プレ).

== History ==
=== Pre-20th century ===
Masquerade balls were a feature of the Carnival season in the 15th century, and involved increasingly elaborate allegorical Royal Entries, pageants, and triumphal processions celebrating marriages and other dynastic events of late medieval court life. They were extended into costumed public festivities in Italy during the 16th century Renaissance, generally elaborate dances held for members of the upper classes, which were particularly popular in Venice.

In April 1877, French novelist Jules Verne sent out almost 700 invitations for an elaborate costume ball, where several of the guests showed up dressed as characters from Verne's novels.

Costume parties (American English) or fancy dress parties (British English) were popular from the 19th century onwards. Costuming guides of the period, such as Samuel Miller's Male Character Costumes (1884) or Ardern Holt's Fancy Dresses Described (1887), feature mostly generic costumes, whether that be period costumes, national costumes, objects or abstract concepts such as "Autumn" or "Night". Most specific costumes described therein are for historical figures although some are sourced from fiction, like Alexandre Dumas' The Three Musketeers or William Shakespeare's characters.

By March 1891, a literal call by Herbert Tibbits for what would today be described as "cosplayers" was advertised for an event held from 5–10 March that year at the Royal Albert Hall in London, for the so-named Vril-Ya Bazaar and Fete based on a science fiction novel and its characters, published two decades earlier.

=== Fan costuming ===
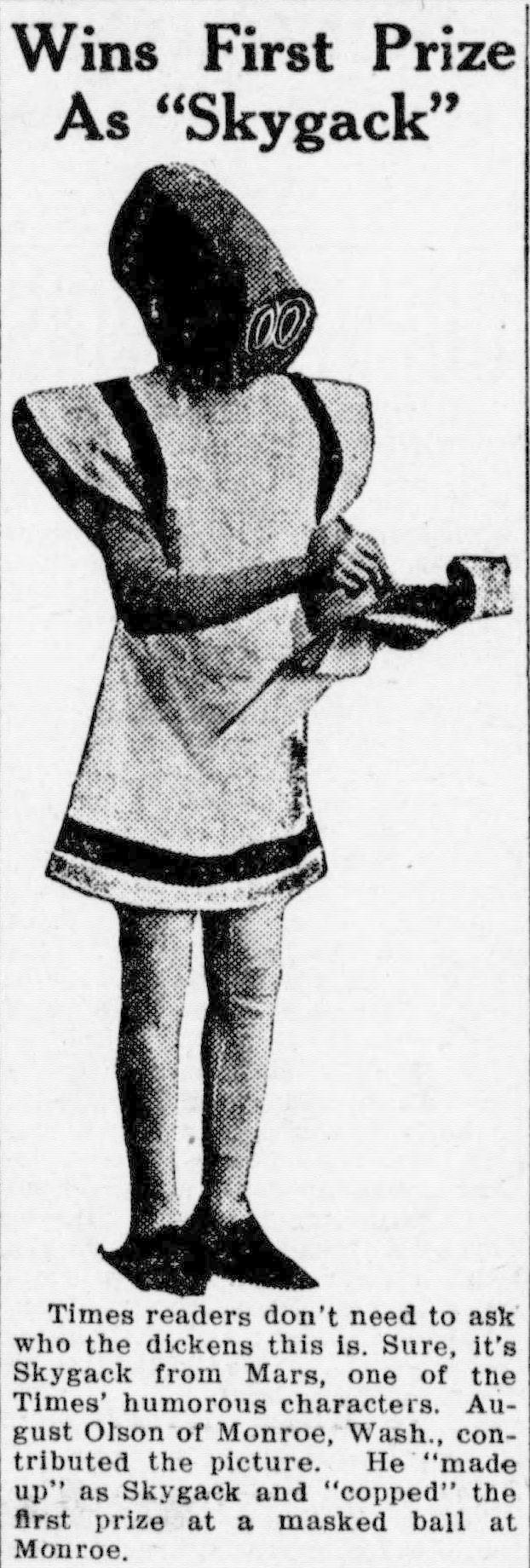
A Mr. Skygack – an early modern costuming or cosplay outfit, Washington state, 1912

A.D. Condo's science fiction comic strip character Mr. Skygack, from Mars (a Martian ethnographer who comically misunderstands many Earthly affairs) is arguably the first fictional character that people emulated by wearing costumes, as in 1908 Mr. and Mrs. William Fell of Cincinnati, Ohio, are reported to have attended a masquerade at a skating rink wearing Mr. Skygack and Miss Dillpickles costumes. Later, in 1910, an unnamed woman won first prize at masquerade ball in Tacoma, Washington, wearing another Skygack costume.

The first people to wear costumes to attend a convention were science fiction fans Forrest J Ackerman and Myrtle R. Douglas, known in fandom as Morojo. They attended the 1939 1st World Science Fiction Convention (Nycon or 1st Worldcon) in the Caravan Hall, New York, US dressed in "futuristicostumes", including green cape and breeches, based on the pulp magazine artwork of Frank R. Paul and the 1936 film Things to Come, designed and created by Douglas.

Forrest J Ackerman and Morojo at the 1st World Science Fiction Convention in "futuricostumes" designed and sewn by Morojo

Ackerman later stated that he thought everyone was supposed to wear a costume at a science fiction convention, although only he and Douglas did.

Fan costuming caught on, however, and the 2nd Worldcon (1940) had both an unofficial masquerade held in Douglas' room and an official masquerade as part of the programme. David Kyle won the masquerade wearing a Ming the Merciless costume created by Leslie Perri, while Robert A. W. Lowndes received second place with a Bar Senestro costume (from the novel The Blind Spot by Austin Hall and Homer Eon Flint). Other costumed attendees included guest of honor E. E. Smith as Northwest Smith (from C. L. Moore's series of short stories) and both Ackerman and Douglas wearing their futuristicostumes again. Masquerades and costume balls continued to be part of World Science Fiction Convention tradition thereafter. Early Worldcon masquerade balls featured a band, dancing, food and drinks. Contestants either walked across a stage or a cleared area of the dance floor.

Ackerman wore a "Hunchbackerman of Notre Dame" costume to the 3rd Worldcon (1941), which included a mask designed and created by Ray Harryhausen, but soon stopped wearing costumes to conventions. Douglas wore an Akka costume (from A. Merritt's novel The Moon Pool), the mask again made by Harryhausen, to the 3rd Worldcon and a Snake Mother costume (another Merritt costume, from The Snake Mother) to the 4th Worldcon (1946). Terminology was not yet settled; the 1944 edition of Jack Speer's Fancyclopedia used the term costume party.

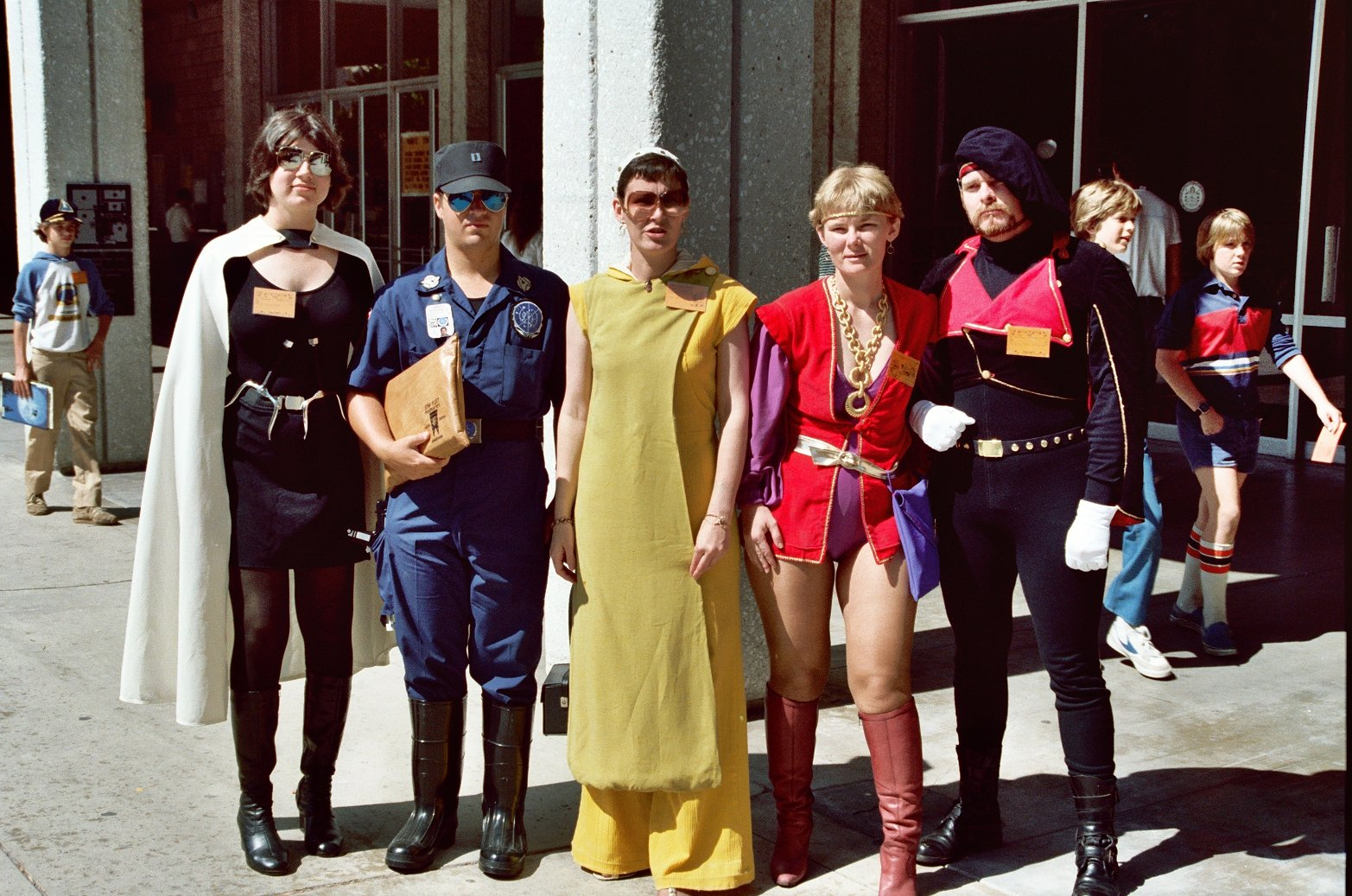
Costuming at the 1982 San Diego Comic-Con

Rules governing costumes became established in response to specific costumes and costuming trends. The first nude contestant at a Worldcon masquerade was in 1952; but the height of this trend was in the 1970s and early 1980s, with a few every year. This eventually led to "No Costume is No Costume" rule, which banned full nudity, although partial nudity was still allowed as long as it was a legitimate representation of the character. Mike Resnick describes the best of the nude costumes as Kris Lundi wearing a harpy costume to the 32nd Worldcon (1974) (she received an honorable mention in the competition). Another costume that instigated a rule change was an attendee at the 20th Worldcon (1962) whose blaster prop fired a jet of real flame; which led to fire being banned. At the 30th WorldCon (1972), artist Scott Shaw wore a costume composed largely of peanut butter to represent his own underground comix character called "The Turd". The peanut butter rubbed off, doing damage to soft furnishings and other peoples' costumes, and then began to go rancid under the heat of the lighting. Food, odious, and messy substances were banned as costume elements after that event.

Costuming spread with the science fiction conventions and the interaction of fandom. The earliest known instance of costuming at a convention in the United Kingdom was at the London Science Fiction Convention (1953) but this was only as part of a play. However, members of the Liverpool Science Fantasy Society attended the 1st Cytricon (1955), in Kettering, wearing costumes and continued to do so in subsequent years. The 15th Worldcon (1957) brought the first official convention masquerade to the UK. The 1960 Eastercon in London may have been the first British convention to hold an official fancy dress party as part of its programme. The joint winners were Ethel Lindsay and Ina Shorrock as two of the titular witches from the novel The Witches of Karres by James H. Schmitz.

Star Trek conventions began in 1969 and major conventions began in 1972 and they have featured cosplay throughout.

In Japan, costuming at conventions was a fan activity from at least the 1970s, especially after the launch of the Comiket convention in December 1975. Costuming at this time was known as kasō (仮装). The first documented case of costuming at a fan event in Japan was at Ashinocon (1978), in Hakone, at which future science fiction critic Mari Kotani wore a costume based on the cover art for Edgar Rice Burroughs' novel A Fighting Man of Mars. (Note: Mari Kotani's costume has sometimes been misreported as a Triton costume (from the manga Triton of the Sea) due to its visual similarity and because Kotani was known as a member of the TRITON fan club.) In an interview Kotani states that there were about twenty costumed attendees at the convention's costume party—made up of members of her Triton of the Sea fan club and Kansai Entertainers (関西芸人, Kansai Geinin), antecedent of the Gainax anime studio—with most attendees in ordinary clothing. One of the Kansai group, an unnamed friend of Yasuhiro Takeda, wore an impromptu Tusken Raider costume (from the film Star Wars) made from one of the host hotel's rolls of toilet paper. Costume contests became a permanent part of the Nihon SF Taikai conventions from Tokon VII in 1980.

Possibly the first costume contest held at a comic book convention was at the 1st Academy Con held at Broadway Central Hotel in New York in August 1965. Roy Thomas, future editor-in-chief of Marvel Comics but then just transitioning from a fanzine editor to a professional comic book writer, attended in a Plastic Man costume.

The first Masquerade Ball held at San Diego Comic-Con was in 1974 during the convention's 6th event. Voice actress June Foray was the master of ceremonies. Future scream queen Brinke Stevens won first place wearing a Vampirella costume. Ackerman (who was the creator of Vampirella) was in attendance and posed with Stevens for photographs. They became friends and, according to Stevens, "Forry and his wife, Wendayne, soon became like my god parents." Photographer Dan Golden saw a photograph of Stevens in the Vampirella costume while visiting Ackerman's house, leading to him hiring her for a non-speaking role in her first student film, Zyzak is King (1980), and later photographing her for the cover of the first issue of Femme Fatales (1992). Stevens attributes these events to launching her acting career.

As early as a year after the 1975 release of The Rocky Horror Picture Show, audience members began dressing as characters from the movie and role-playing (although the initial incentive for dressing-up was free admission) in often highly accurate costumes.

Costume-Con, a conference dedicated to costuming, was first held in January 1983. The International Costumers Guild, Inc., originally known as the Greater Columbia Fantasy Costumer's Guild, was launched after the 3rd Costume-Con (1985) as a parent organization and to support costuming.

=== Cosplay ===
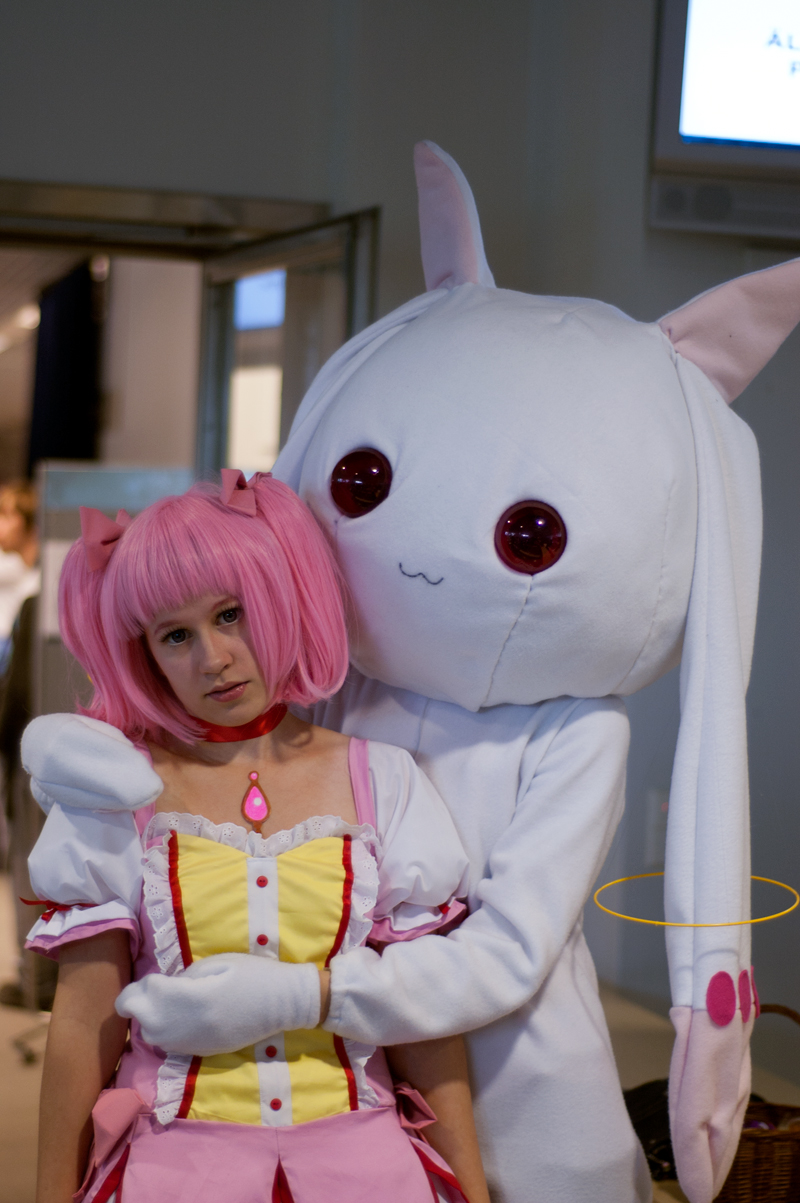
Madoka Kaname and Kyubey from Puella Magi Madoka Magica during Tracon 2013 event at the Tampere Hall in Tampere, Finland

Costuming had been a fan activity in Japan from the 1970s, and it became much more popular in the wake of Takahashi's report. The new term did not catch on immediately, however. It was a year or two after the article was published before it was in common use among fans at conventions. It was in the 1990s, after exposure on television and in magazines, that the term and practice of cosplaying became common knowledge in Japan.

The first cosplay cafés appeared in the Akihabara area of Tokyo in the late 1990s. A temporary maid café was set up at the Tokyo Character Collection event in August 1998 to promote the video game Welcome to Pia Carrot 2 (1997). An occasional Pia Carrot Restaurant was held at the shop Gamers in Akihabara in the years up to 2000. Being linked to specific intellectual properties limited the lifespan of these cafés, which was solved by using generic maids, leading to the first permanent establishment, Cure Maid Café, which opened in March 2001.

The first World Cosplay Summit was held on 12 October 2003 at the Rose Court Hotel in Nagoya, Japan, with five cosplayers invited from Germany, France and Italy. There was no contest until 2005, when the World Cosplay Championship began. The first winners were the Italian team of Giorgia Vecchini, Francesca Dani and Emilia Fata Livia.

Worldcon masquerade attendance peaked in the 1980s and started to fall thereafter. This trend was reversed when the concept of cosplay was re-imported from Japan.

== Practice ==
Cosplay costumes vary greatly and can range from simple themed clothing to highly detailed costumes. It is generally considered different from Halloween and Mardi Gras costume wear, as the intention is to replicate a specific character, rather than to reflect the culture and symbolism of a holiday event. As such, when in costume, some cosplayers often seek to adopt the affect, mannerisms, and body language of the characters they portray (with "out of character" breaks). The characters chosen to be cosplayed may be sourced from any movie, TV series, book, comic book, video game, musical artist, anime, or manga. Some cosplayers even choose to cosplay an original character of their own design or a fusion of different genres (e.g., a steampunk version of a character), and it is a part of the ethos of cosplay that anybody can be anything, as with genderbending, crossplay, or drag, a cosplayer playing a character of another ethnicity, or a hijabi portraying Captain America.

=== Costumes ===
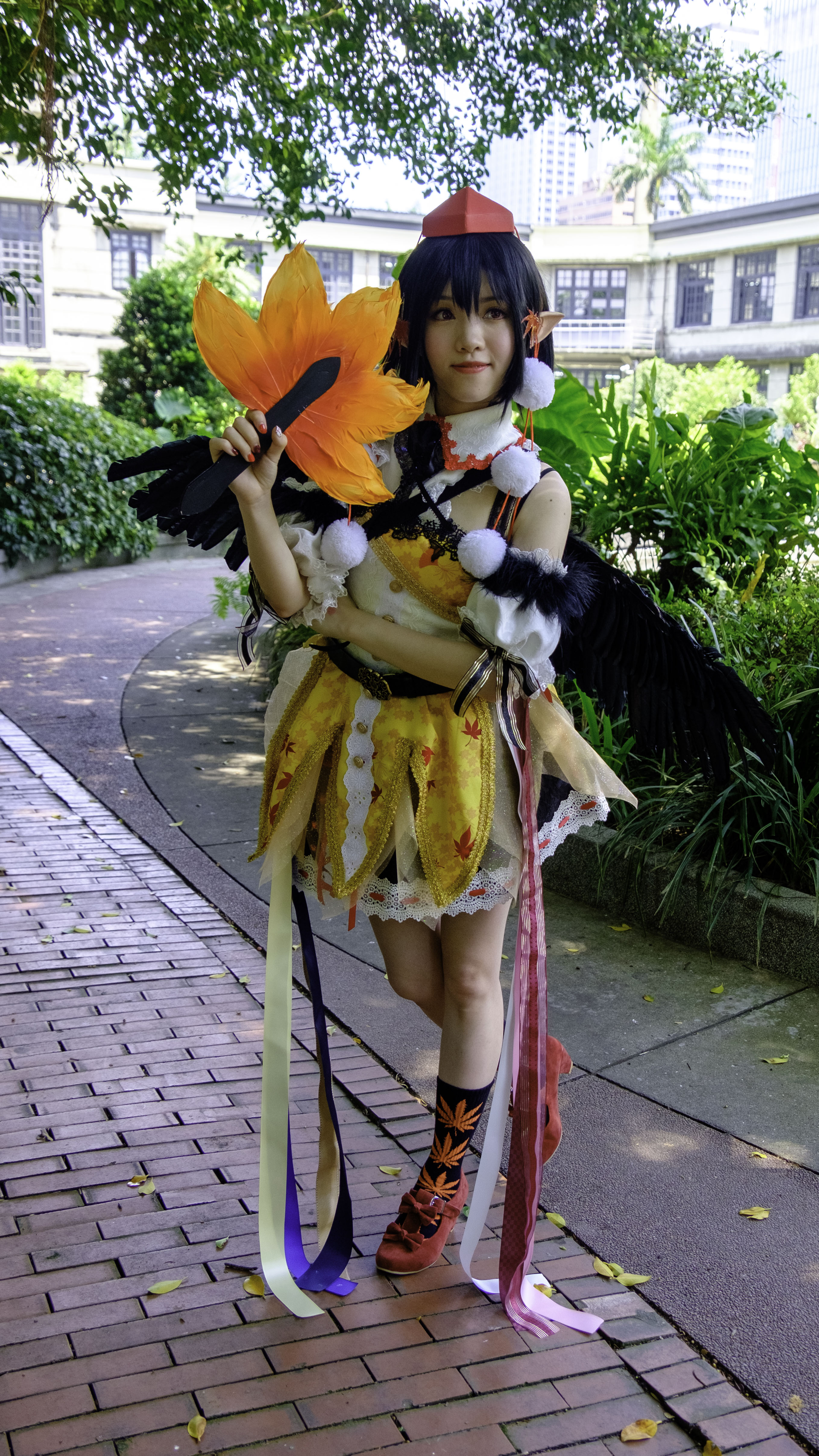
Cosplay of Aya Shameimaru from Touhou Project at the Hakurei Shrine Reitaisai in Taiwan 3, 2019

Cosplayers obtain their apparel through many different methods. Manufacturers produce and sell packaged outfits for use in cosplay, with varying levels of quality. These costumes are often sold online, but also can be purchased from dealers at conventions. Japanese manufacturers of cosplay costumes reported a profit of 35 billion yen in 2008. A number of individuals also work on commission, creating custom costumes, props, or wigs designed and fitted to the individual. Other cosplayers, who prefer to create their own costumes, still provide a market for individual elements, and various raw materials, such as unstyled wigs, hair dye, cloth and sewing notions, liquid latex, body paint, costume jewelry, and prop weapons.

Cosplay represents an act of embodiment. Cosplay has been closely linked to the presentation of self, yet cosplayers' ability to perform is limited by their physical features. The accuracy of a cosplay is judged based on the ability to accurately represent a character through the body, and individual cosplayers frequently are faced by their own "bodily limits" such as level of attractiveness, body size, and disability that often restrict how accurate the cosplay is perceived to be. Authenticity is measured by a cosplayer's individual ability to translate on-screen manifestation to the cosplay itself. Some have argued that cosplay can never be a true representation of the character; instead, it can only be read through the body, and that true embodiment of a character is judged based on nearness to the original character form. Cosplaying can also help some of those with self-esteem problems.

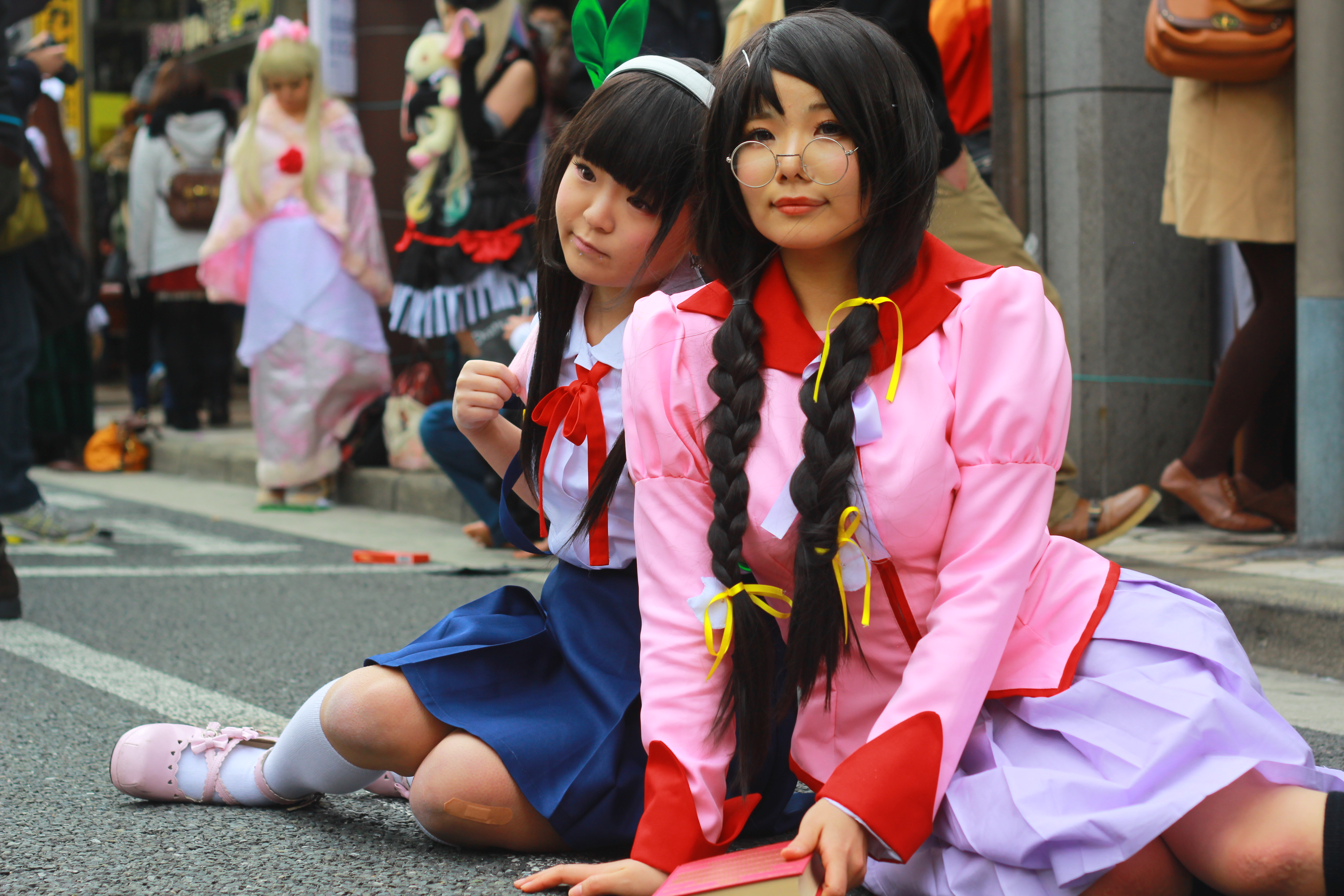
Monogatari series cosplayers at Nippombashi Street Festa 2014

Many cosplayers create their own outfits, referencing images of the characters in the process. In the creation of the outfits, much time is given to detail and qualities, thus the skill of a cosplayer may be measured by how difficult the details of the outfit are and how well they have been replicated. Because of the difficulty of replicating some details and materials, cosplayers often educate themselves in crafting specialties such as textiles, sculpture, face paint, fiberglass, fashion design, woodworking, and other uses of materials in the effort to render the look and texture of a costume accurately. Cosplayers often wear wigs in conjunction with their outfit to further improve the resemblance to the character. This is especially necessary for anime and manga or video-game characters who often have unnaturally colored and uniquely styled hair. Simpler outfits may be compensated for their lack of complexity by paying attention to material choice and overall high quality.

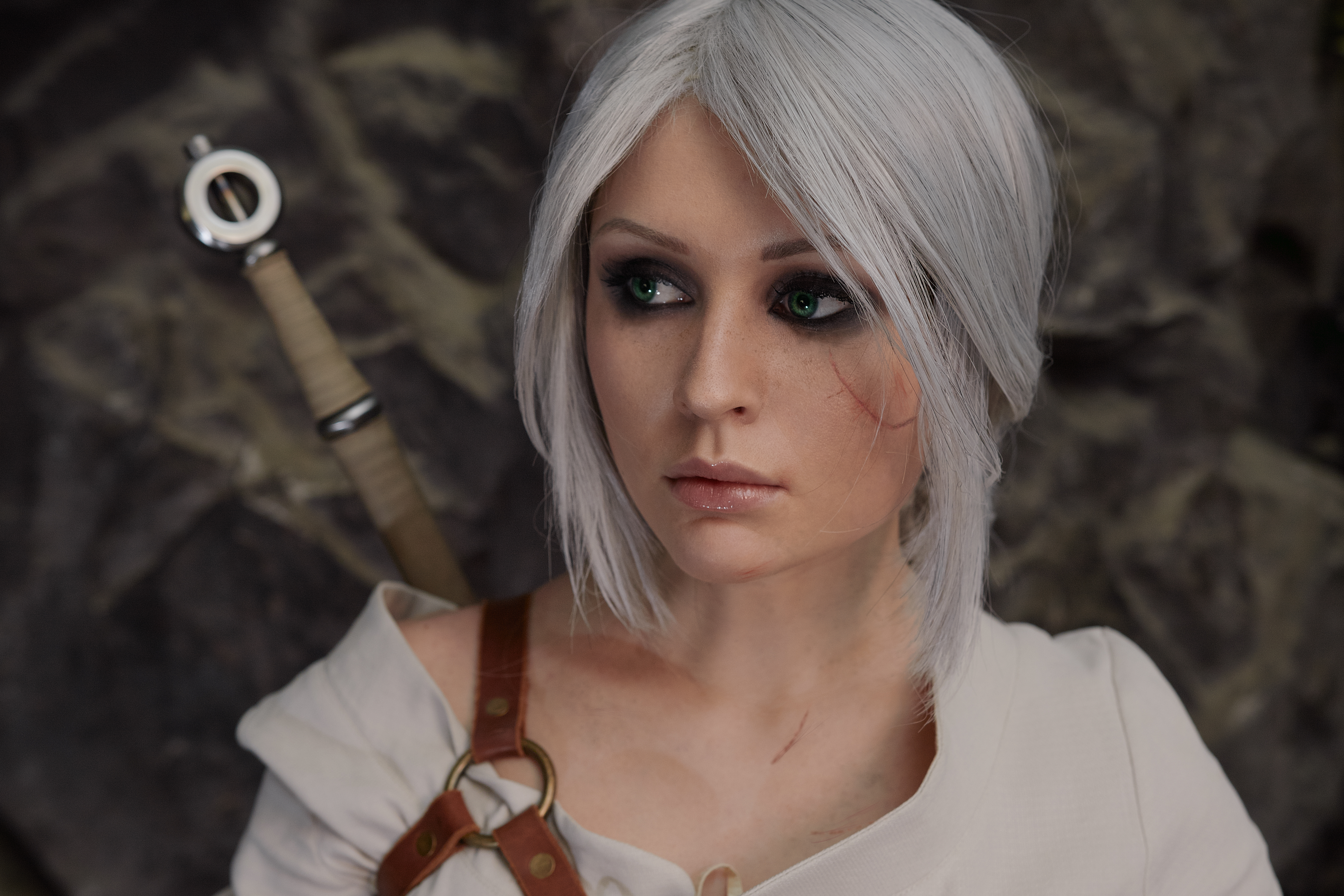
A model cosplaying Ciri, a main character of The Witcher 3: Wild Hunt

To look more like the characters they are portraying, cosplayers might also engage in various forms of body modification. Cosplayers may opt to change their skin color, utilizing make-up to more simulate the race of the character they are adopting. Contact lenses that match the color of their character's eyes are a common form of this, especially in the case of characters with particularly unique eyes as part of their trademark look. Contact lenses that make the pupil look enlarged to visually echo the large eyes of anime and manga characters are also used. Another form of body modification in which cosplayers engage is to copy any tattoos or special markings their character might have. Temporary tattoos, permanent marker, body paint, and in rare cases, permanent tattoos, are all methods used by cosplayers to achieve the desired look. Permanent and temporary hair dye, spray-in hair coloring, and specialized extreme styling products are all used by some cosplayers whose natural hair can achieve the desired hairstyle. It is also commonplace for them to shave off their eyebrows to gain a more accurate look.

Some anime and video game characters have weapons or other accessories that are hard to replicate, and conventions have strict rules regarding those weapons, but most cosplayers engage in some combination of methods to obtain all the items necessary for their costumes; for example, they may commission a prop weapon, sew their own clothing, buy character jewelry from a cosplay accessory manufacturer, or buy a pair of off-the-rack shoes, and modify them to match the desired look.

=== Presentation ===
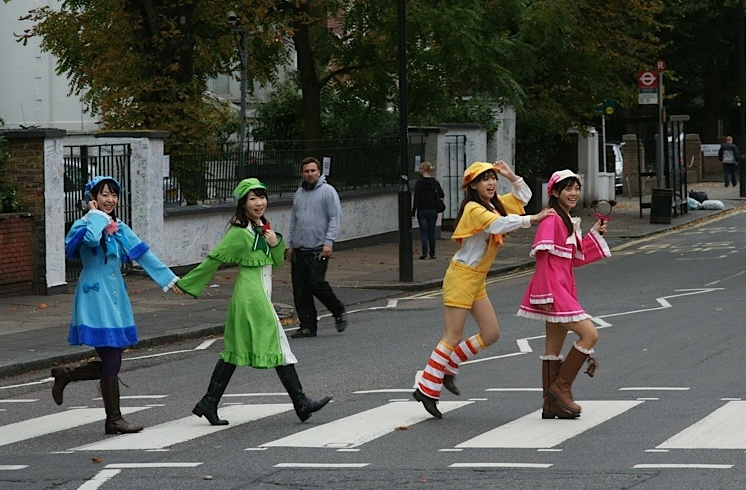
The four voice actresses of the Japanese manga/media franchise Milky Holmes reenacting the famous cover of the Beatles album Abbey Road (1969) during their London visit in 2010

Cosplay may be presented in a number of ways and places. A subset of cosplay culture is centered on sex appeal, with cosplayers specifically choosing characters known for their attractiveness or revealing costumes. However, wearing a revealing costume can be a sensitive issue while appearing in public. People appearing naked at American science fiction fandom conventions during the 1970s were so common, a "no costume is no costume" rule was introduced. Some conventions throughout the United States, such as Phoenix Comicon (now known as Phoenix Fan Fusion) and Penny Arcade Expo, have also issued rules upon which they reserve the right to ask attendees to leave or change their costumes if deemed to be inappropriate to a family-friendly environment or something of a similar nature.

==== Conventions ====
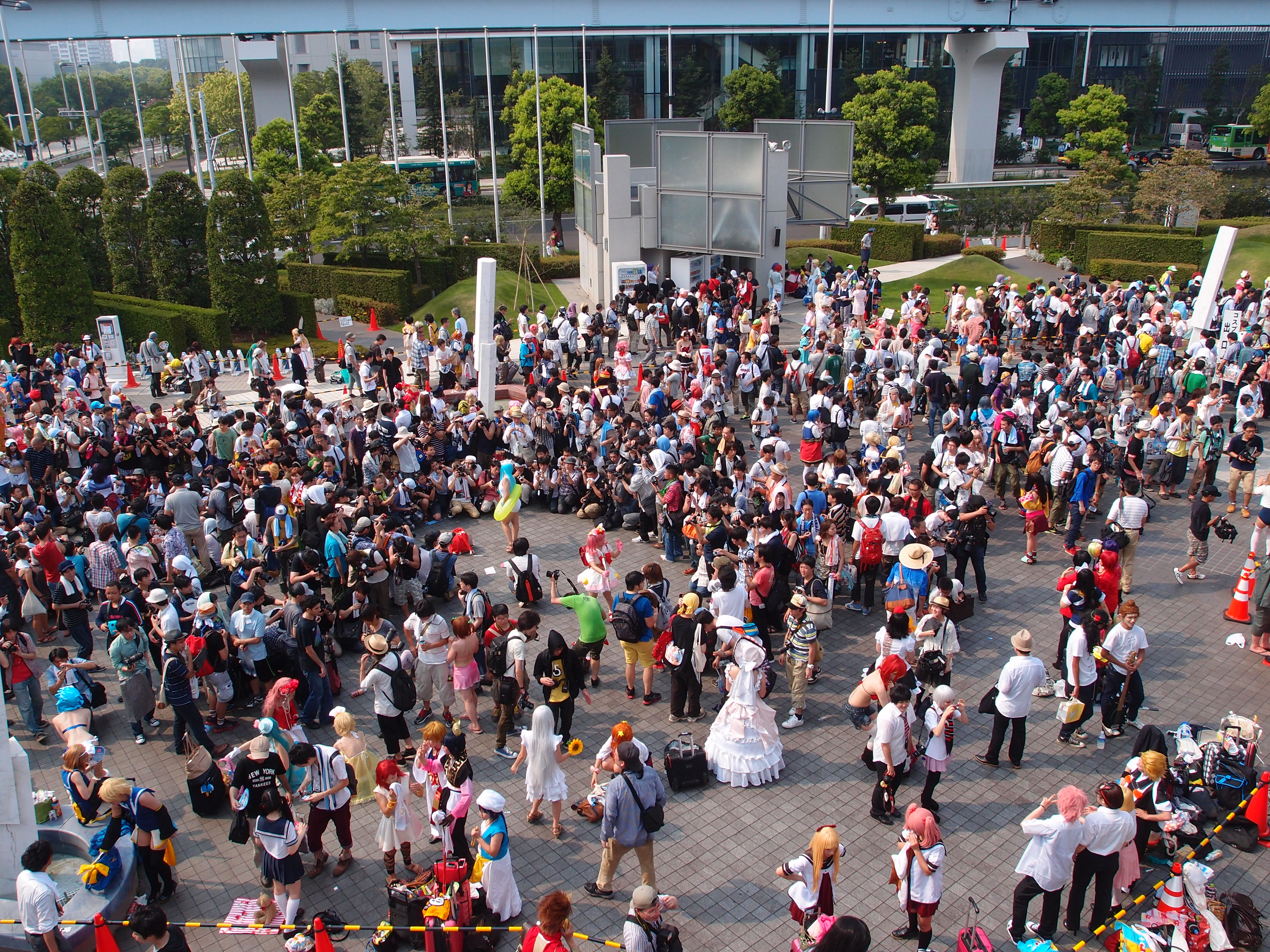
A crowd including many cosplayers at Comiket 84 in 2013

The most popular form of presenting a cosplay publicly is by wearing it to a fan convention. Multiple conventions dedicated to anime and manga, comics, TV shows, video games, science fiction, and fantasy may be found all around the world. Cosplay-centered conventions include Cosplay Mania in the Philippines and EOY Cosplay Festival in Singapore.

The single largest event featuring cosplay is the semiannual doujinshi market, Comic Market (Comiket), held in Japan during summer and winter. Comiket attracts hundreds of thousands of manga and anime fans, where thousands of cosplayers congregate on the roof of the exhibition center. In North America, the highest-attended fan conventions featuring cosplayers are San Diego Comic-Con and New York Comic Con held in the United States, and the anime-specific Anime North in Toronto, Otakon held in Washington, D.C. and Anime Expo held in Los Angeles. Europe's largest event is Japan Expo held in Paris, while the London MCM Expo and the London Super Comic Convention are the most notable in the UK. Supanova Pop Culture Expo is Australia's biggest event.

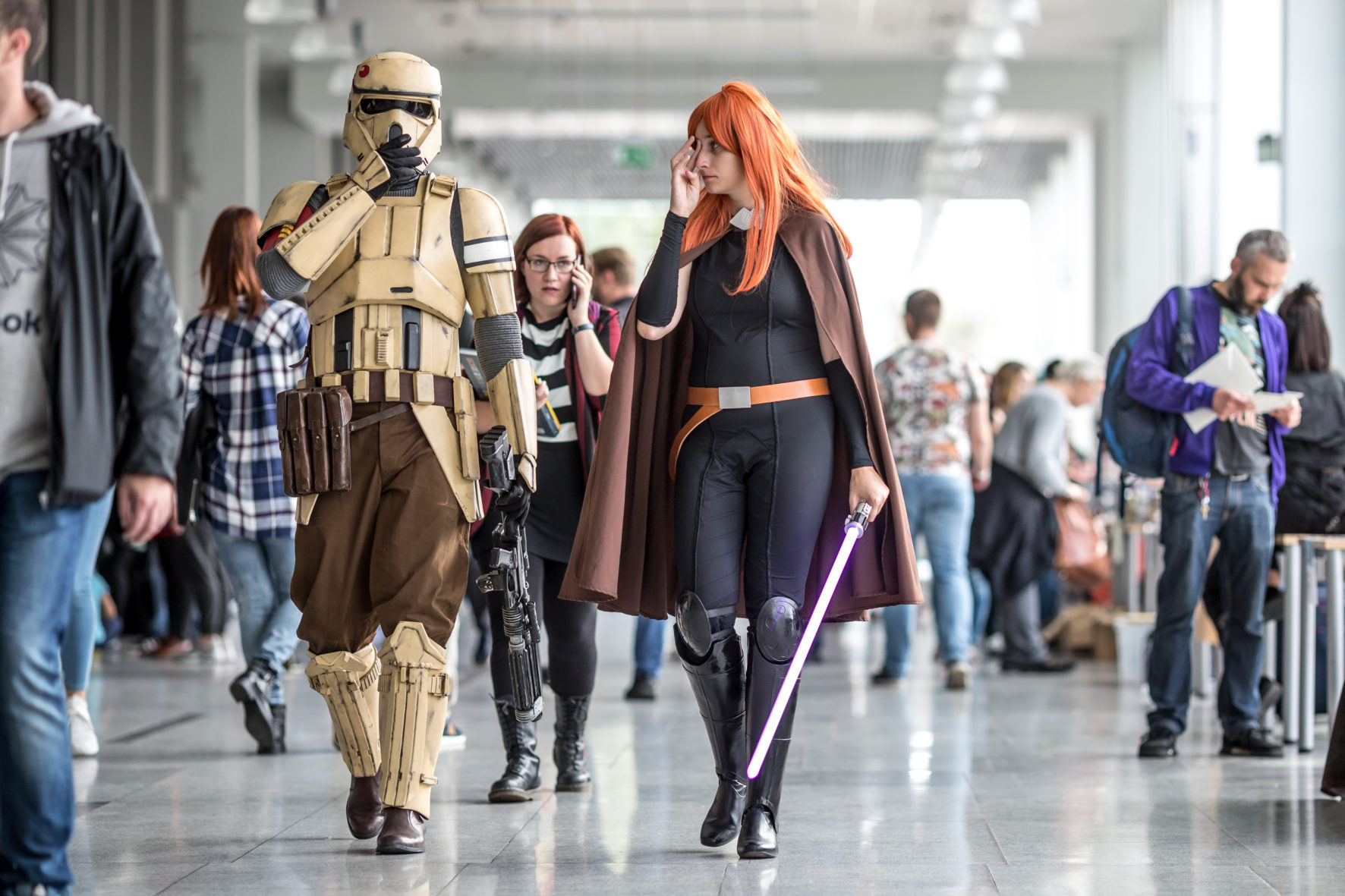
Cosplayers at the International Festival of Comics and Games in Łódź, 2019

Star Trek conventions have featured cosplay for many decades. These include Destination Star Trek, a UK convention, and Star Trek Las Vegas, a US convention.

In different comic fairs, "Thematic Areas" are set up where cosplayers can take photos in an environment that follows that of the game or animation product from which they are taken. Sometimes the cosplayers are part of the area, playing the role of staff with the task of entertaining the other visitors. Some examples are the thematic areas dedicated to Star Wars or to Fallout. The areas are set up by not for profit associations of fans, but in some major fairs it is possible to visit areas set up directly by the developers of the video games or the producers of the anime.

==== Photography ====
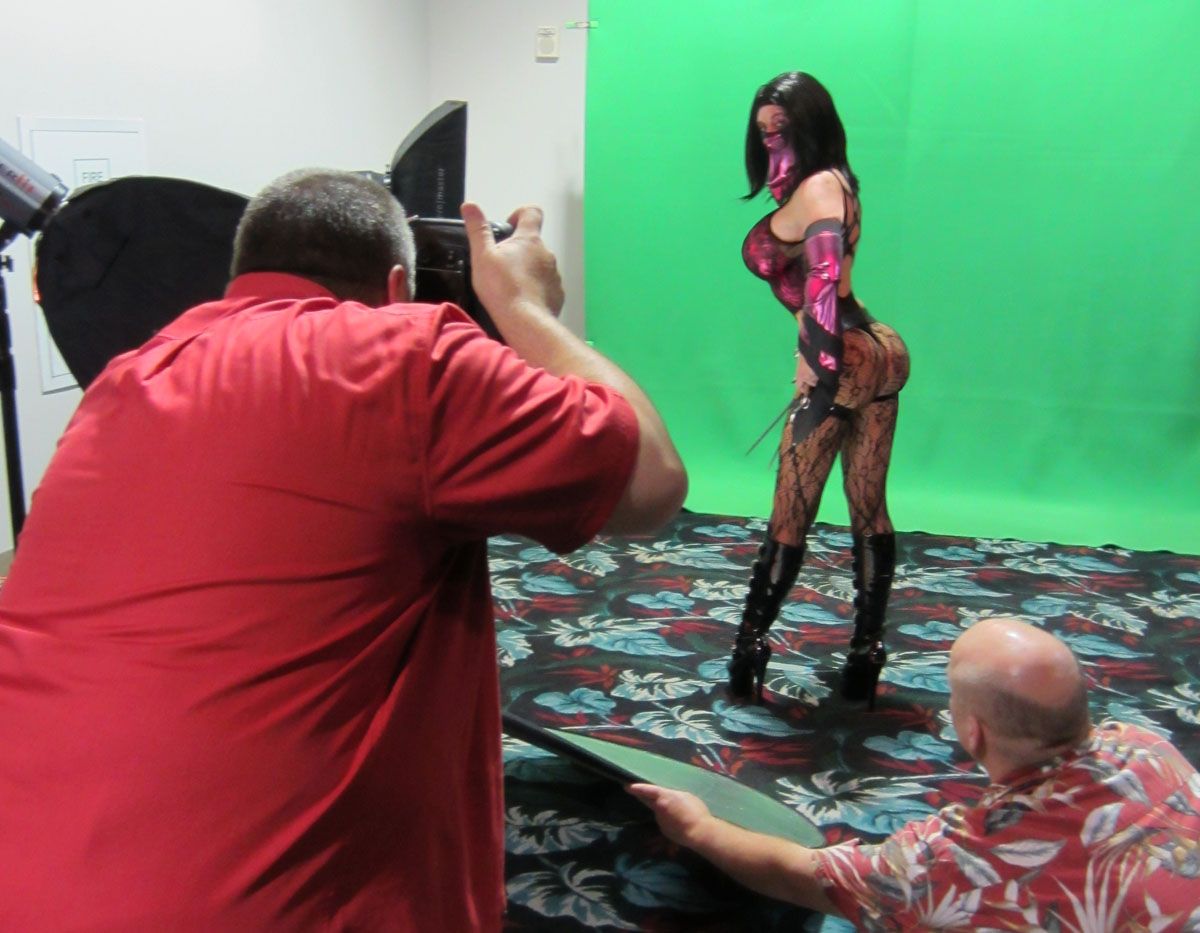
Professional photographers working with an Mileena cosplayer for a chroma key studio photoshoot at Space City Con 2014 in the United States

The appearance of cosplayers at public events makes them a popular draw for photographers. As this became apparent in the late 1980s, a new variant of cosplay developed in which cosplayers attended events mainly for the purpose of modeling their characters for still photography rather than engaging in continuous role play. Rules of etiquette were developed to minimize awkward situations involving boundaries. Cosplayers pose for photographers and photographers do not press them for personal contact information or private sessions, follow them out of the area, or take photos without permission. The rules allow the collaborative relationship between photographers and cosplayers to continue with the least inconvenience to each other.

Some cosplayers choose to have a professional photographer take high quality images of them in their costumes posing as the character. Cosplayers and photographers frequently exhibit their work online and sometimes sell their images.

=== Competitions ===
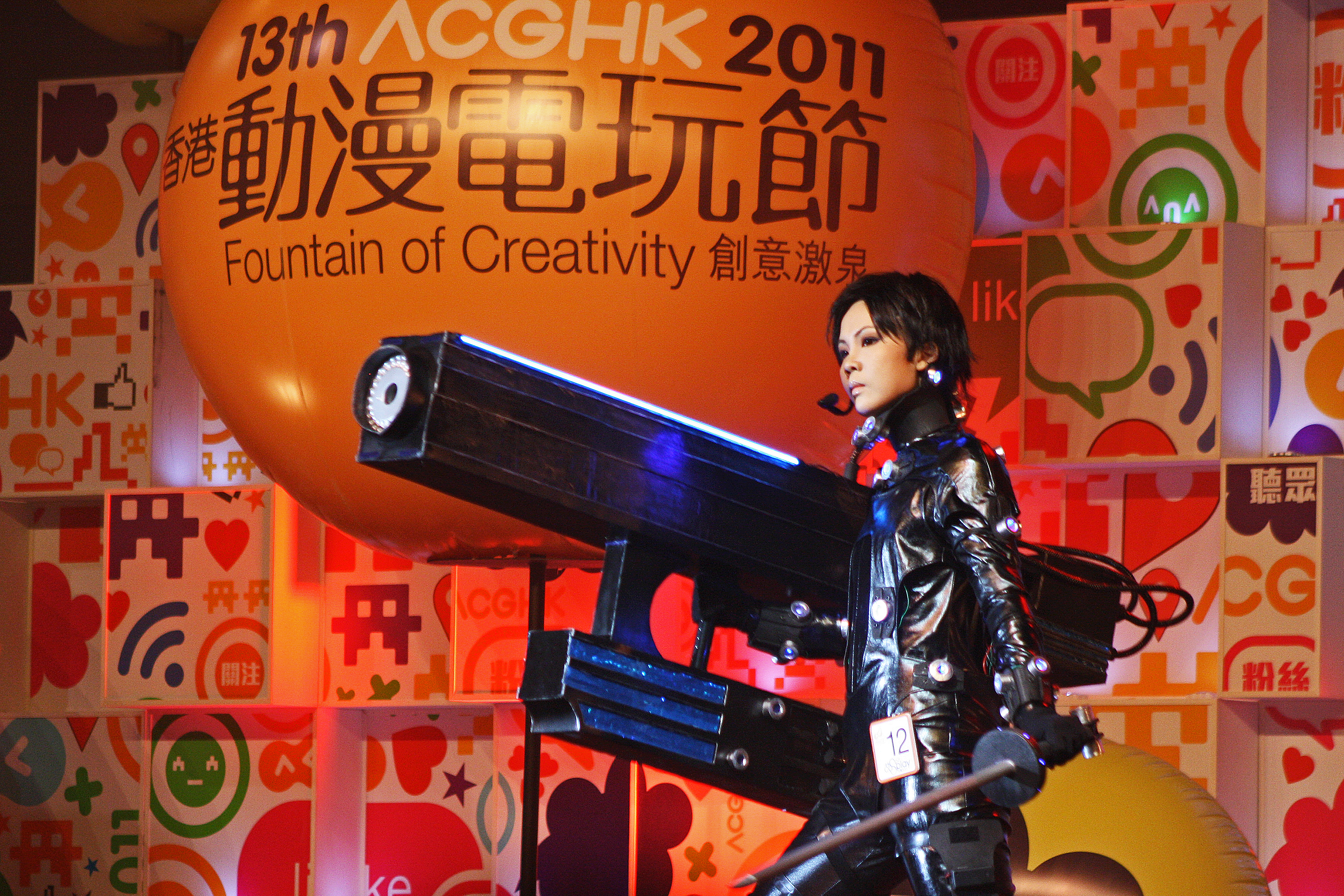
A cosplayer at the 2011 Animation-Comic-Game Hong Kong contest dressed as a character from Gantz

As the popularity of cosplay has grown, many conventions have come to feature a contest surrounding cosplay that may be the main feature of the convention. Contestants present their cosplay, and often to be judged for an award, the cosplay must be self-made. The contestants may choose to perform a skit, which may consist of a short performed script or dance with optional accompanying audio, video, or images shown on a screen overhead. Other contestants may simply choose to pose as their characters. Often, contestants are briefly interviewed on stage by a master of ceremonies. The audience is given a chance to take photos of the cosplayers. Cosplayers may compete solo or in a group. Awards are presented, and these awards may vary greatly. Generally, a best cosplayer award, a best group award, and runner-up prizes are given. Awards may also go to the best skit and a number of cosplay skill subcategories, such as master tailor, master weapon-maker, master armorer, and so forth.

The most well-known cosplay contest event is the World Cosplay Summit, selecting cosplayers from 40 countries to compete in the final round in Nagoya, Japan. Some other international events include European Cosplay Gathering (finals taking place at Japan Expo in Paris), EuroCosplay (finals taking place at London MCM Comic Con), and the Nordic Cosplay Championship (finals taking place at NärCon in Linköping, Sweden).

==== Common judging criteria ====
This table contains a list of the most common cosplay competition judging criteria, as seen from World Cosplay Summit, Cyprus Comic Con, and ReplayFX.

Criteria	Description	Example
Accuracy	Resemblance to the original character in terms of appearance.	Hair color/styling; Make-up; Costume; Props; Stage props
Craftsmanship	Quality and details of the costume and props.	How well the costume is made; Maneuverability/functionality of the costume; Quality of materials; Level of detail; Amount of effort; Percentage of costume that is handmade; Technique
Presentation	Likeliness in terms of character portrayal and performance.	Acting; Posture; Movement; Talking with iconic phrases and tones of the character; Facial expressions; Interaction with other characters; Faithfulness to the story
Audience Impact	Stage presence and connection with the audience.	Eye contact; Making full usage of the stage space; Engaging with the audience

=== Gender and crossplay ===
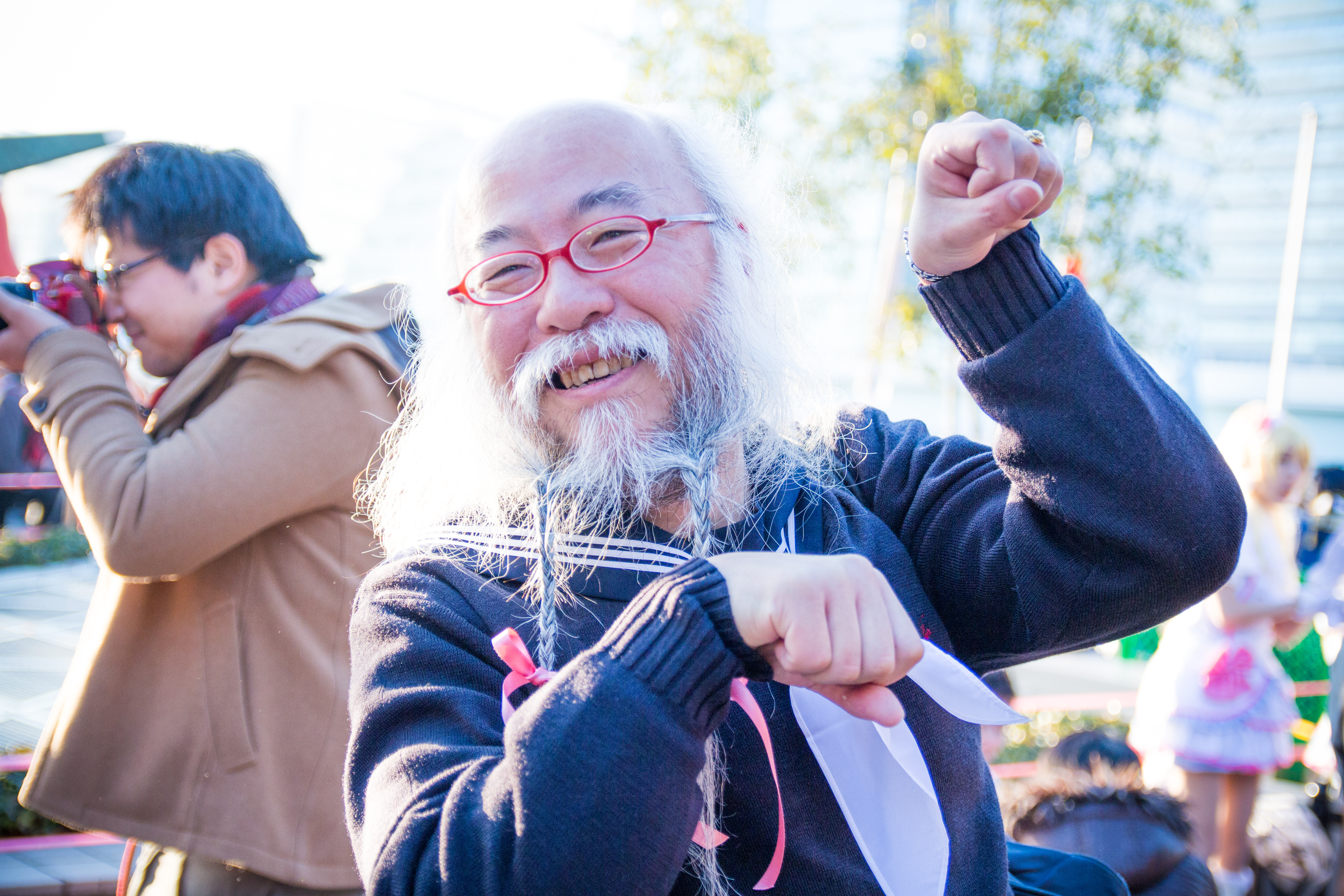
Hideaki Kobayashi, known for crossplaying as a schoolgirl

Portraying a character of the opposite sex is called crossplay. The practicality of crossplay and cross-dress stems in part from the abundance in manga of male characters with delicate and somewhat androgynous features. Such characters, known as bishōnen (lit. 'pretty boy'), are Asian equivalent of the elfin boy archetype represented in Western tradition by figures such as Peter Pan and Ariel.

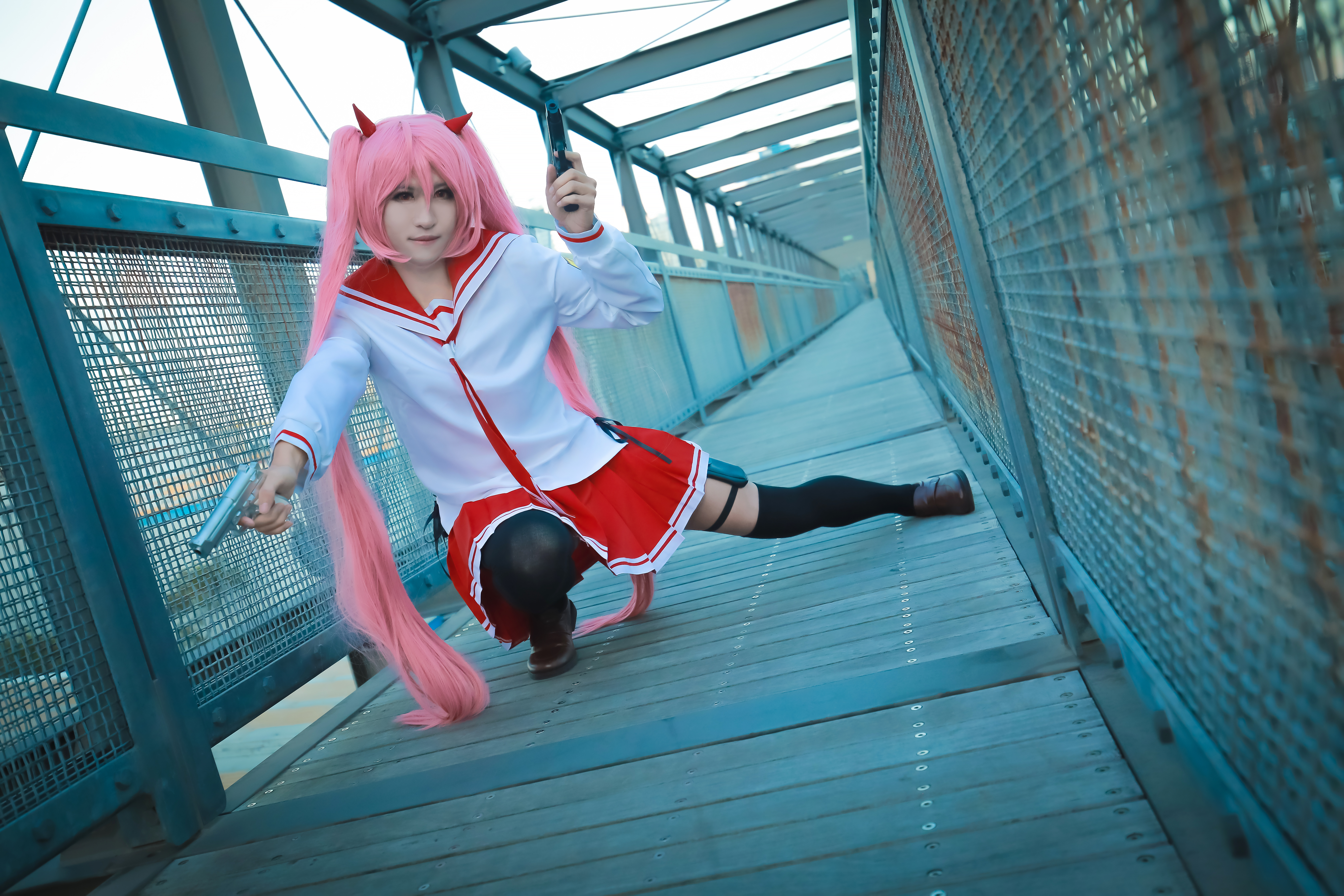
Aria H. Kanzaki from Aria the Scarlet Ammo by a crossplayer from New Zealand

Male to female cosplayers may experience issues when trying to portray a female character because it is hard to maintain the sexualized femininity of a character. Male cosplayers may also be subjected to discrimination, including homophobic comments and being touched without permission. This affects men possibly even more often than it affects women, despite inappropriate contact already being a problem for women who cosplay, as is "slut-shaming".

Animegao kigurumi players, a niche group in the realm of cosplay, are often male cosplayers who use zentai and stylized masks to represent female anime characters. These cosplayers completely hide their real features so the original appearance of their characters may be reproduced as literally as possible, and to display all the abstractions and stylizations such as oversized eyes and tiny mouths often seen in Japanese cartoon art. This does not mean that only males perform animegao or that masks are only female.

=== Harassment issues ===
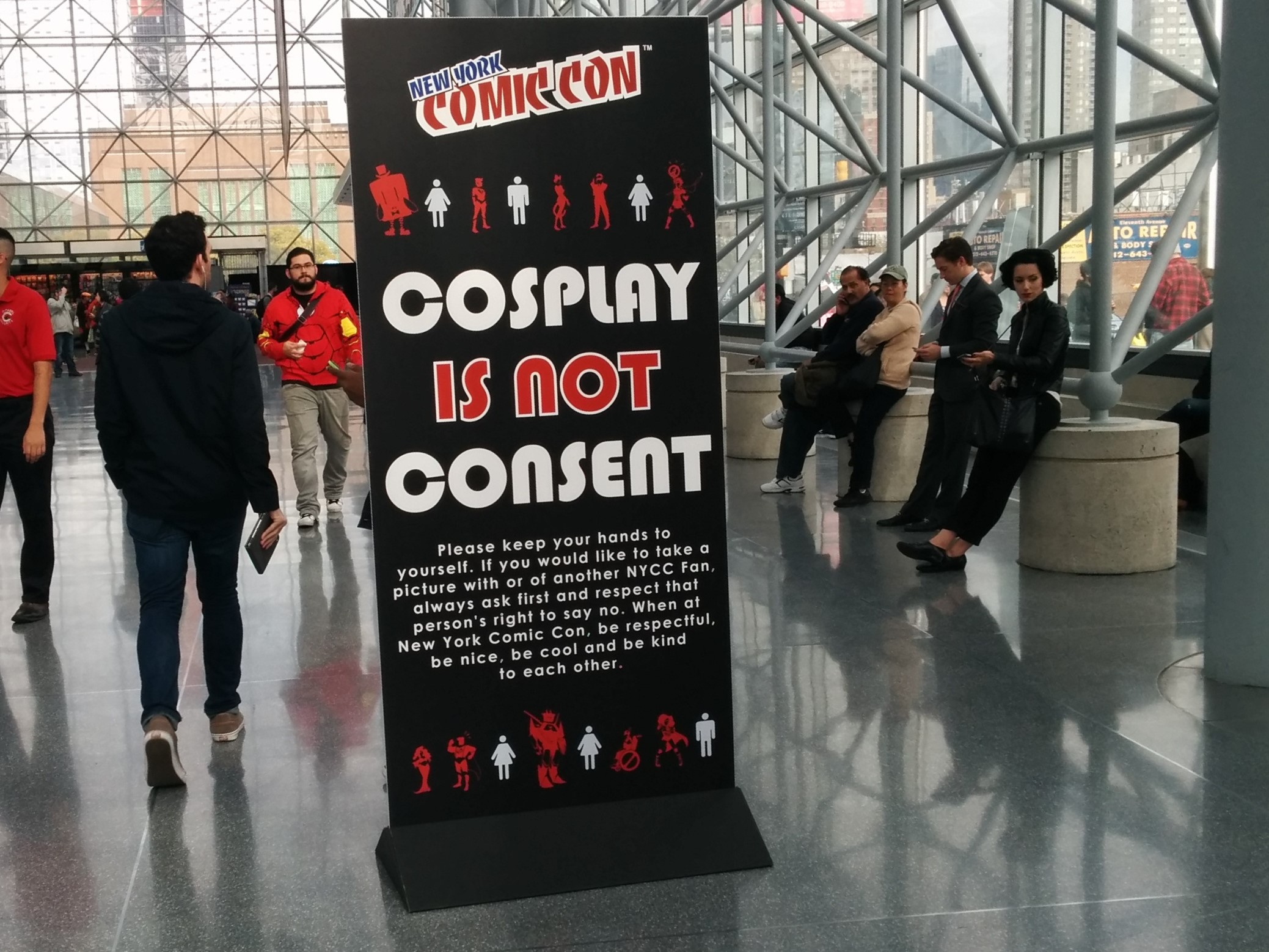
"Cosplay Is Not Consent" sign at the 2014 New York Comic Con

"Cosplay Is Not Consent", a movement started in 2013 by Rochelle Keyhan, Erin Filson, and Anna Kegler, brought attention to the issue of sexual harassment in the convention attending cosplay community. Harassment of cosplayers include photography without permission, verbal abuse, touching, and groping. Harassment is not limited to women in provocative outfits as male cosplayers talked about being bullied for not fitting certain costume and characters.

Starting in 2014, New York Comic Con placed large signs at the entrance stating that "Cosplay is Not Consent". Attendees were reminded to ask permission for photos and respect the person's right to say no. The movement against sexual harassment against cosplayers has continued to gain momentum and awareness since being publicized. Traditional mainstream news media like The Mercury News and Los Angeles Times have reported on the topic, bringing awareness of sexual harassment to those outside of the cosplay community.

=== Ethnicity ===
As cosplay has entered more mainstream media, ethnicity has become a controversial point. Cosplayers of different skin color than the character are often ridiculed for not being 'accurate' or 'faithful'. Many cosplayers feel as if anyone can cosplay any character, but it becomes complicated when cosplayers are not respectful of the character's ethnicity. These views against non-white cosplayers within the community have been attributed to the lack of representation in the industry and in media. Issues such as blackface, brownface, and yellowface are still controversial since a large part of the cosplay community see these as separate problems, or simply an acceptable part of cosplay.

=== Models ===
Two people and a BYD Yuan Plus cosplaying as Twilight Sparkle

Cosplay has influenced the advertising industry, in which cosplayers are often used for event work previously assigned to agency models. Some cosplayers have thus transformed their hobby into profitable, professional careers. Japan's entertainment industry has been home to the professional cosplayers since the rise of Comiket and Tokyo Game Show. The phenomenon is most apparent in Japan but exists to some degree in other countries as well. Professional cosplayers who profit from their art may experience problems related to copyright infringement.

A cosplay model, also known as a cosplay idol, cosplays costumes for anime and manga or video game companies. Good cosplayers are viewed as fictional characters in the flesh, in much the same way that film actors come to be identified in the public mind with specific roles. Cosplayers have modeled for print magazines like Cosmode and a successful cosplay model can become the brand ambassador for companies like Cospa. Some cosplay models can achieve significant recognition. While there are many significant cosplay models, Yaya Han was described as having emerged "as a well-recognized figure both within and outside cosplay circuits". Jessica Nigri, used her recognition in cosplay to gain other opportunities such as voice acting and her own documentary on Rooster Teeth. Liz Katz used her fanbase to take her cosplay from a hobby to a successful business venture, sparking debate through the cosplay community whether cosplayers should be allowed to fund and profit from their work.

In the 2000s, cosplayers started to push the boundaries of cosplay into eroticism paving the way to "erocosplay". The advent of social media coupled with crowdfunding platforms like Patreon and OnlyFans have allowed cosplay models to turn cosplay into profitable full-time careers.

== During protests ==
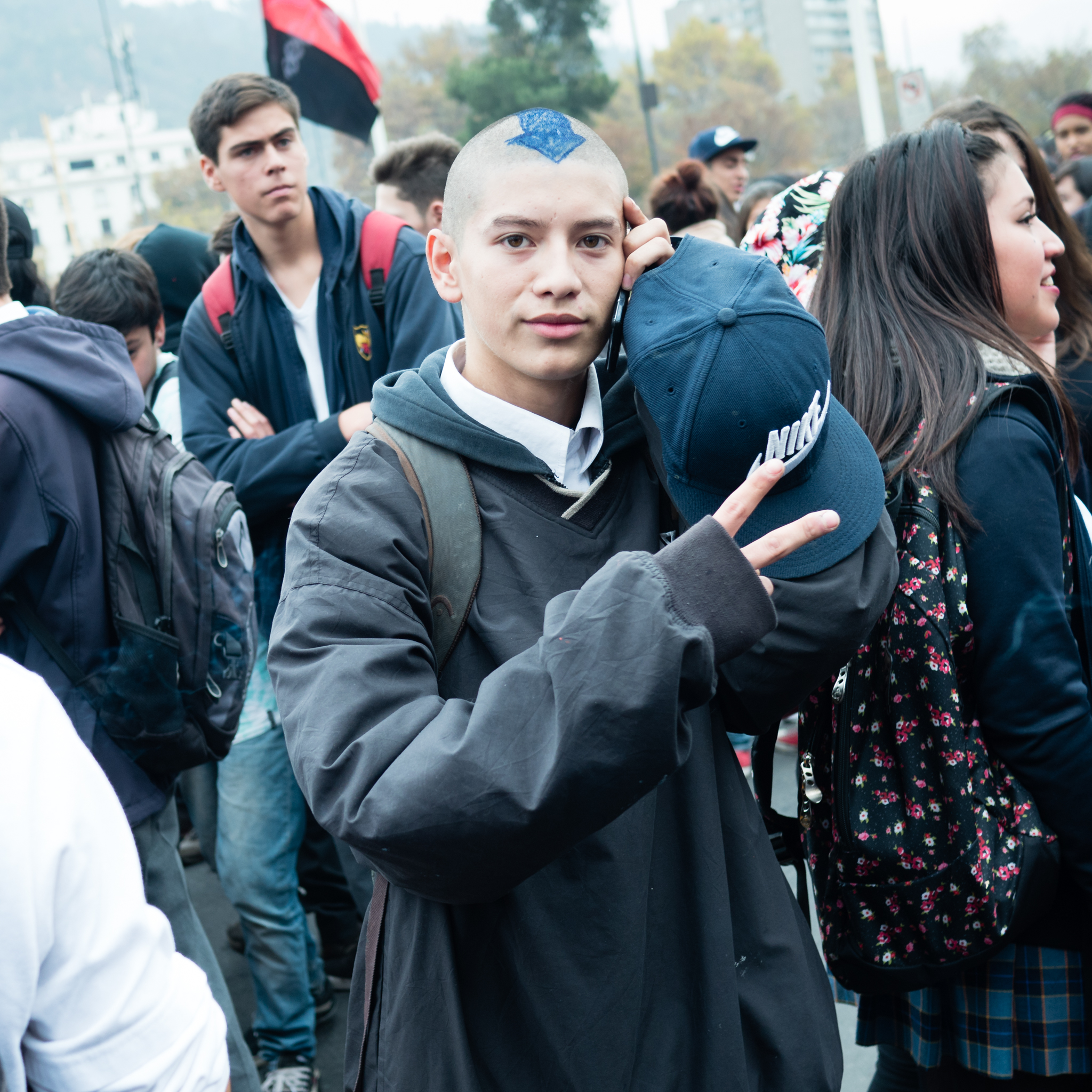
Student protest with a cosplay of Aang from Avatar: The Last Airbender

During various protests, cosplaying is sometimes used as a satirization of important people and political events. In Myanmar various protests after the 2021 coup d'état occurred with cosplayers. Youth groups protested on the roads by wearing cosplay costumes, skirts, wedding dresses, and other unusual clothing for daily life while holding signboards and vinyl banners that break with the country's more traditional protest messages for the purpose of grabbing attention from both domestic and international press media. Other times fictional characters are used to convey a message, such as women dressing like characters from The Handmaid's Tale to protest bodily restrictions in the United States.

== By country or region ==
=== In Japan ===
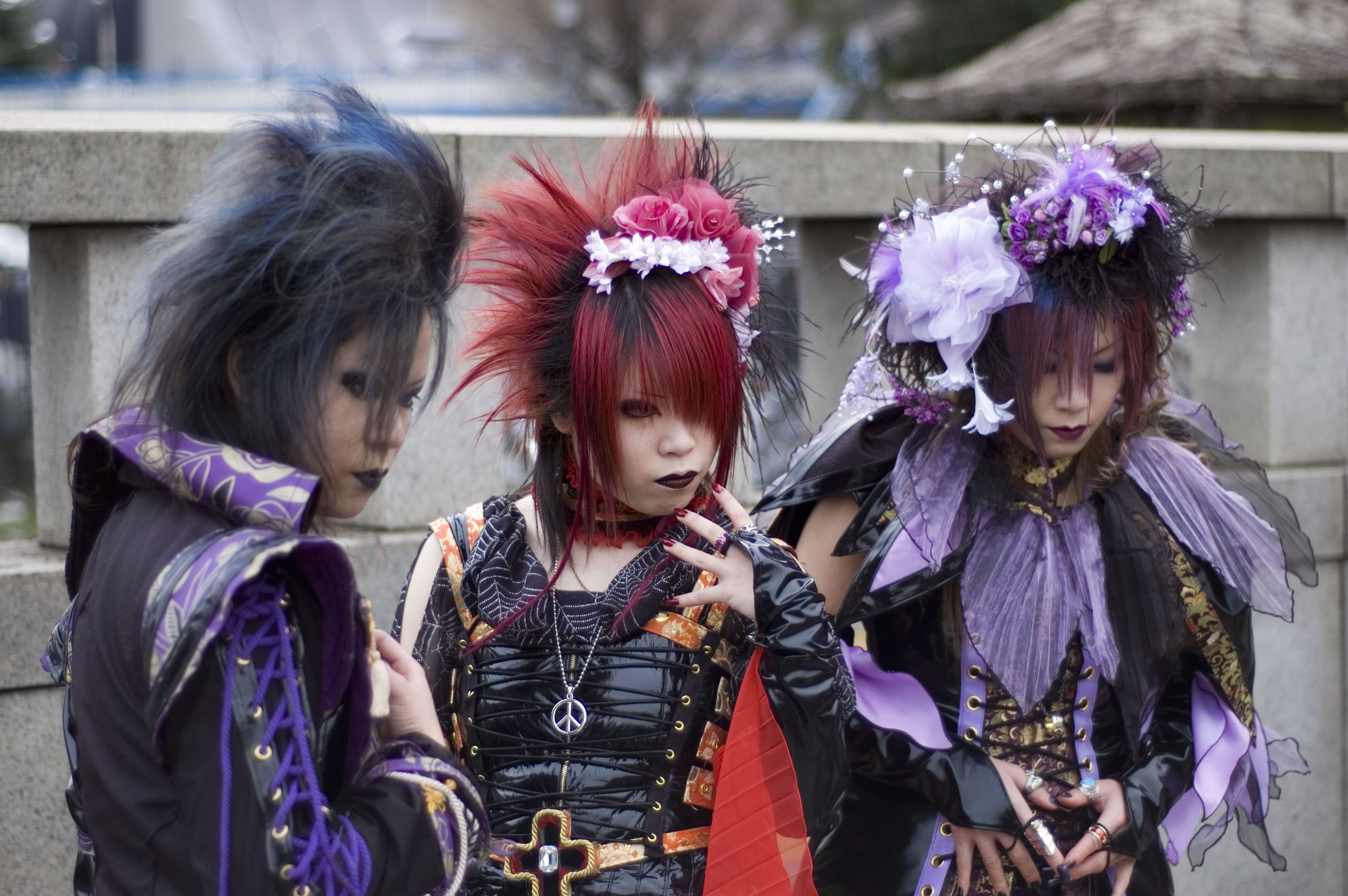
The Jingūbashi, which passes over the Yamanote Line south of Harajuku Station in Tokyo, near the gate of Meiji Shrine, is a well-known gathering place for cosplayers. Pictured is a group of people dressed as visual kei-style musicians in 2006.

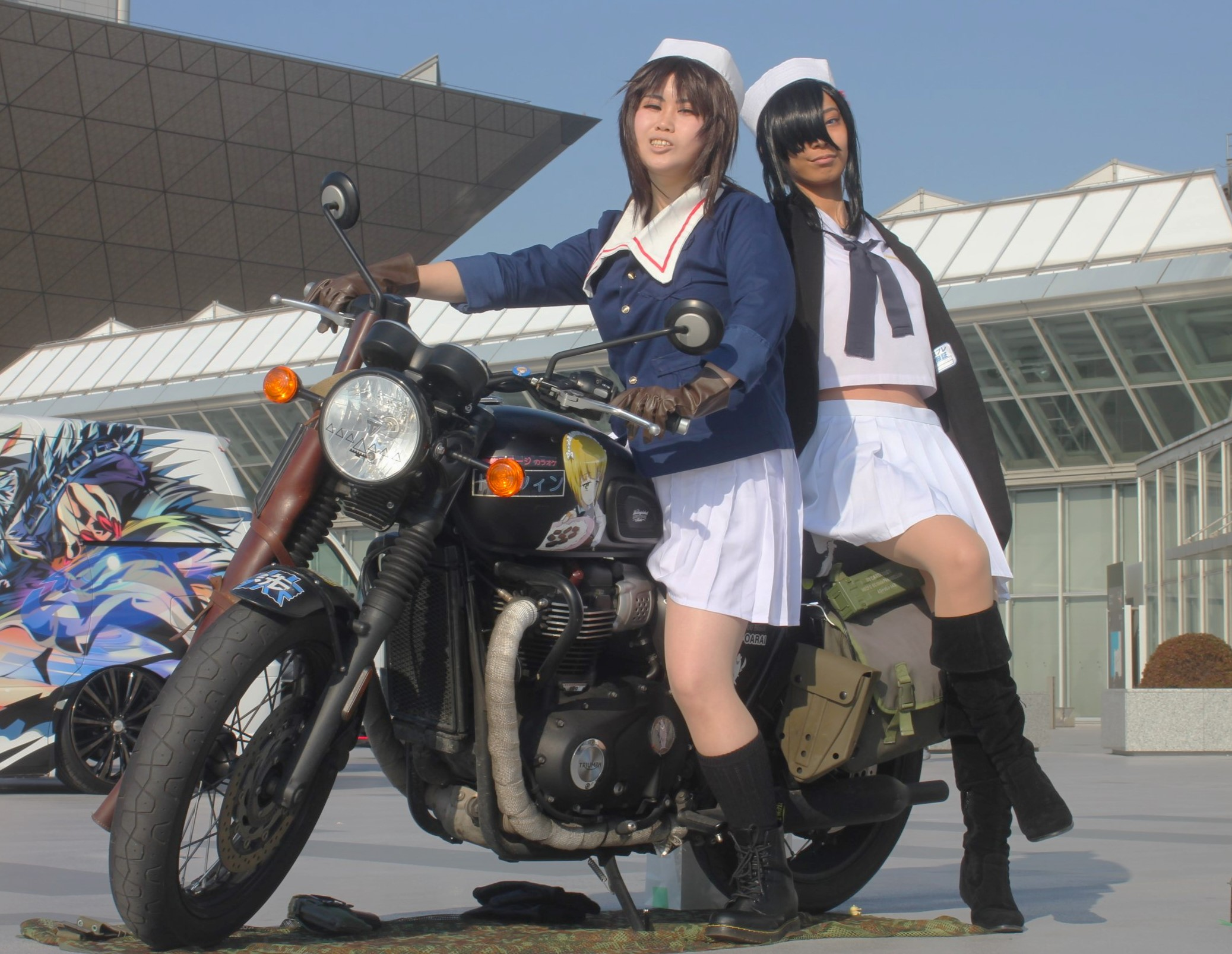
Women cosplaying as characters from Girls und Panzer in the itasha exhibition area during a fanzine sales event at Tokyo Big Sight.

Cosplayers in Japan formerly referred to themselves as reiyā (レイヤー), pronounced "layer". In contemporary Japan, however, cosplayers are more commonly referred to as kosupure (コスプレ), pronounced "ko-su-pray", as the term reiyā is now more frequently used to describe literal layers (for example, hair or clothing). Words such as kawaii (可愛い) (lit. 'cute') and kakko ī (かっこいい) (lit. 'cool') were often used to describe these changes, expressions that were closely tied to notions of femininity and masculinity.

Those who photograph players are known as cameko (カメコ), a shortened form of camera kozō (カメラ小僧) (lit. 'camera boy'). Originally, cameko would give printed photographs to players as gifts. Growing interest in cosplay events—both among photographers and cosplayers willing to model—has led to the formalization of procedures at events such as Comiket. Photography is conducted in designated areas separate from the exhibit halls. In Japan, wearing costumes outside of conventions or other designated areas is generally discouraged.

Since 1998, Tokyo's Akihabara district has contained a number of cosplay restaurants catering to devoted anime and manga fans, in which waitresses dress as characters from video games, anime, or manga; maid cafés are particularly popular. In Japan, Tokyo's Harajuku district serves as a favored informal gathering place for engaging in cosplay in public. Events held in Akihabara also attract large numbers of cosplayers.

Ishoku-hada (異色肌) is a form of Japanese cosplay in which players use body paint to alter their skin color to match that of the character they portray. This practice allows for the representation of anime or manga characters, as well as video game characters, with non-human skin tones.

A 2014 survey conducted for the Comiket convention in Japan reported that approximately 75% of cosplayers attending the event were female.

=== In other Asian countries ===
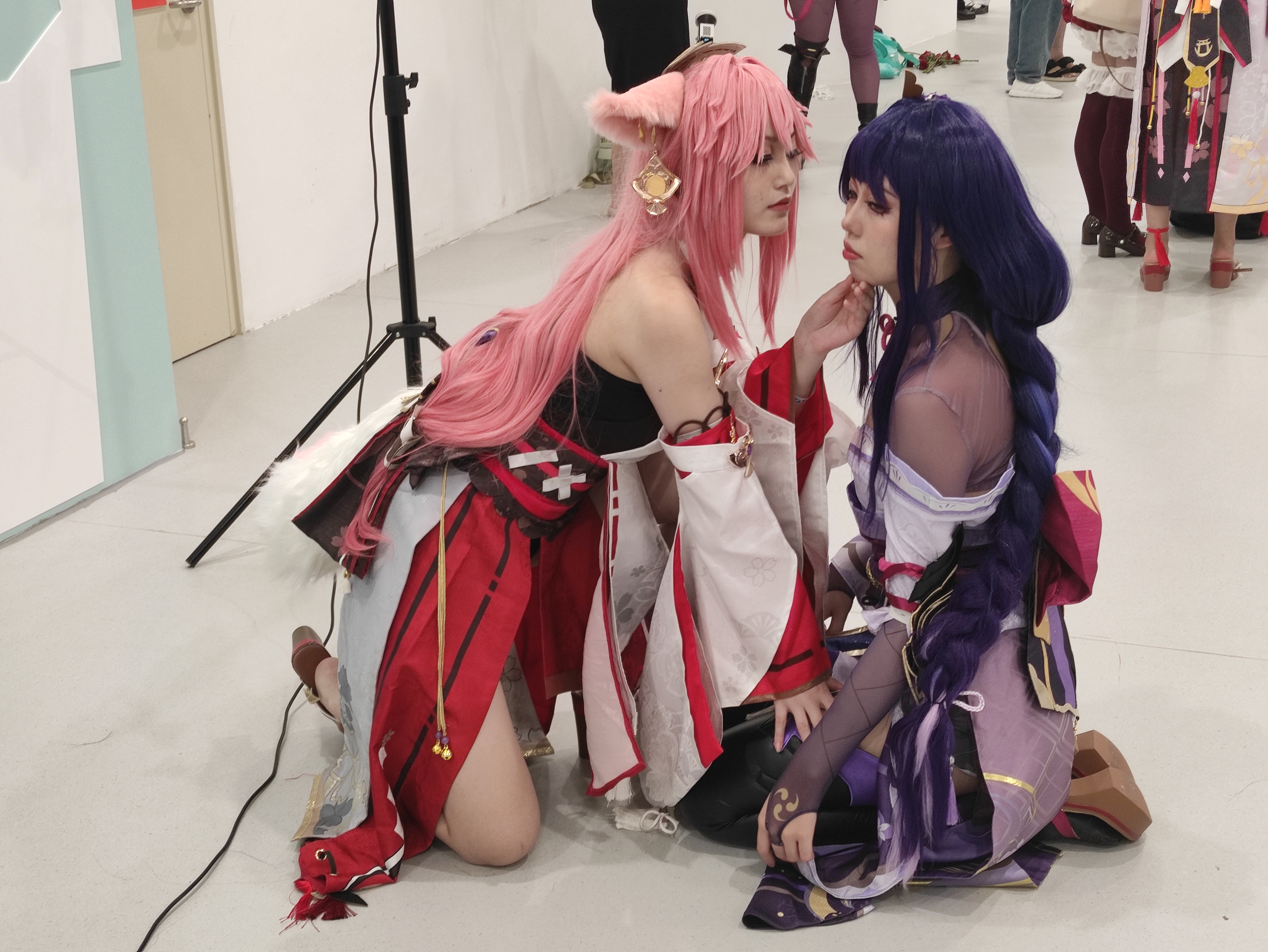
Yuri cosplay of Raiden Ei and Yae Miko from Genshin Impact at 2nd Nanjing Shuijing Guochao Games Carnival, 2023

Cosplay is common in many East Asian countries. For example, it is a major part of the Comic World conventions taking place regularly in South Korea, Hong Kong and Taiwan. Historically, the practice of dressing up as characters from works of fiction can be traced as far as the 17th century late Ming dynasty China.

In Malaysia, cosplay has developed to be a growing community with participation in international competitions such as the World Cosplay Summit. Figures such as Kazuki Foo have been cited in media coverage for supporting the development of local cosplay initiatives.

=== In Western countries ===
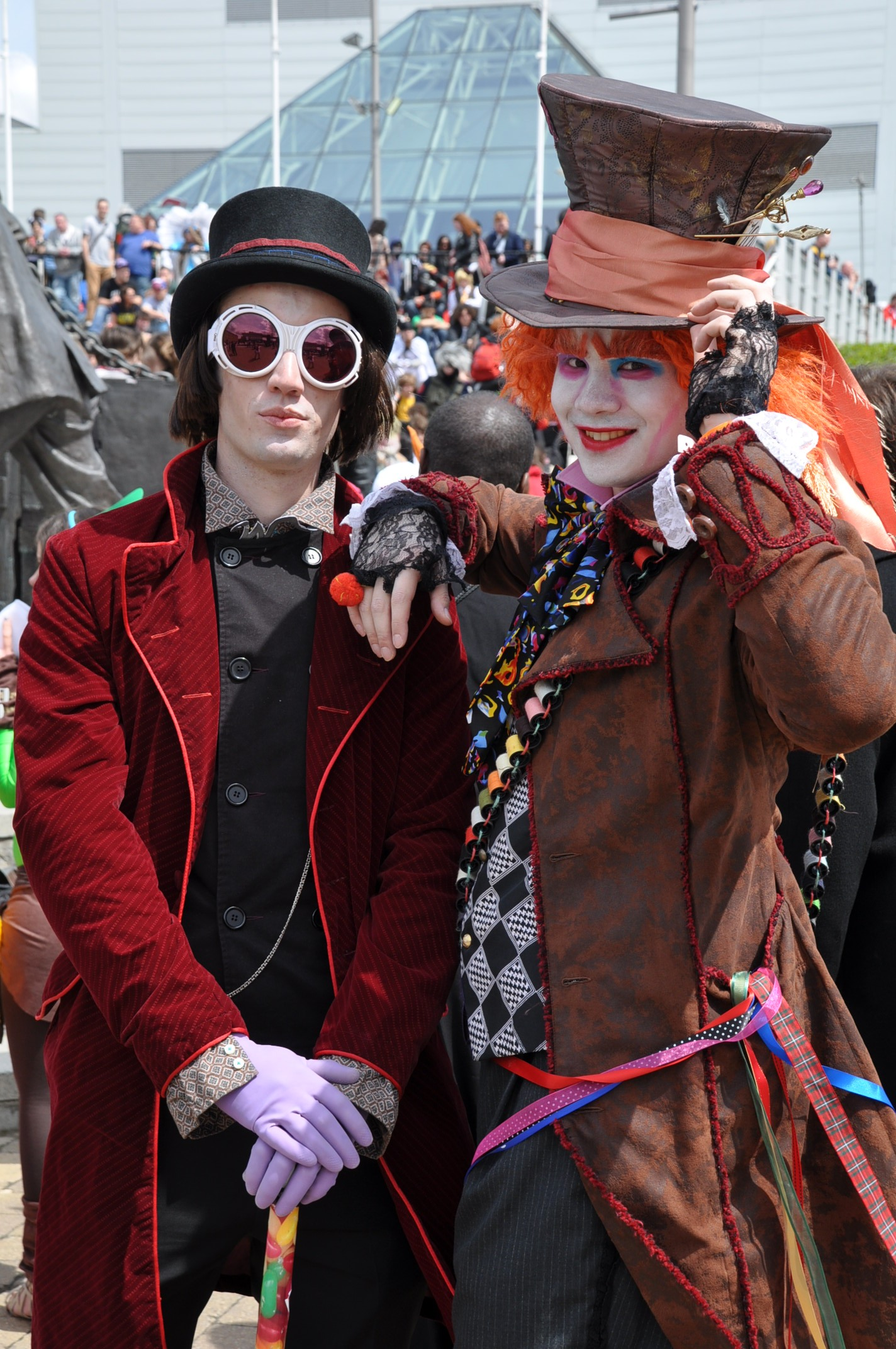
Willy Wonka (Charlie and the Chocolate Factory) and Tarrant Hightopp (Alice in Wonderland) at the 2013 London Comic Con. Both characters were portrayed by Johnny Depp in films directed by Tim Burton.

Western cosplay developed primarily from science fiction and fantasy fandoms. Compared with Japan, Western cosplayers are more likely to portray characters originating from live-action television series and films. Western costuming traditions also encompass a variety of related hobbyist subcultures, including participants in Renaissance faires, live action role-playing games, and historical reenactments. Costume competitions at science fiction conventions commonly feature masquerades, in which costumes are formally judged during stage presentations, as well as hall costumes that are evaluated informally throughout the event.

The growing international popularity of Japanese anime during the late 2000s contributed to a rise in American and other Western cosplayers portraying characters from manga and anime. Over the following decade, anime conventions became increasingly common across Western countries, often rivaling long-established science fiction, comic book, and historical conventions in terms of attendance. At these events, cosplayers—much like their Japanese counterparts—gather to display their costumes, be photographed, and participate in competitive costume events. Convention attendees also frequently choose to dress as characters from Western comic books, animated works, films, and video games.

Despite increasing global exchange, cultural differences in taste remain evident. Certain costume styles that may be worn without hesitation by Japanese cosplayers are often avoided in Western contexts, particularly those that resemble Nazi uniforms. Western cosplayers may also encounter debates regarding legitimacy when portraying characters whose canonical racial backgrounds differ from their own, and instances of insensitivity toward cosplayers depicting characters of different skin tones have been documented. Western cosplayers who portray anime characters may likewise experience targeted ridicule or misunderstanding.

In comparison with Japan, wearing costumes in public spaces is generally more socially accepted in countries such as the United Kingdom, Ireland, the United States, and Canada. These regions possess longer-standing traditions of Halloween costuming, fan dress, and related practices. Consequently, it is not uncommon for convention attendees in costume to be seen in nearby restaurants and public venues outside the immediate boundaries of the event itself.

== Media ==
=== Magazines and books ===
Japan is home to two especially popular cosplay magazines, Cosmode (コスモード) and ASCII Media Works' Dengeki Layers (電撃Layers). Cosmode has the largest share in the market and an English-language digital edition. Another magazine, aimed at a broader, worldwide audience is CosplayGen. In the United States, Cosplay Culture began publication in February 2015. Other magazines include CosplayZine featuring cosplayers from all over the world since October 2015, and Cosplay Realm Magazine which was started in April 2017. There are many books on the subject of cosplay as well.

=== Documentaries and reality shows ===
- Cosplay Encyclopedia, a 1996 film about Japanese cosplay released by Japan Media Supply. It was released in subtitled VHS by Anime Works in 1999, eventually being released onto DVD in 2002.
- Otaku Unite!, a 2004 film about otaku subculture, features extensive footage of cosplayers.
- Akihabara Geeks, a 2005 Japanese short film.
- Animania: The Documentary is a 2007 film that explores the cosplay cultural phenomenon in North America, following four cosplayers from various ethnicities as they prepare to compete at Anime North, Canada's largest anime convention.
- Conventional Dress is a short documentary about cosplay at Dragon Con made by Celia Pearce and her students in 2008.
- Cosplayers: The Movie, released in 2009 by Martell Brothers Studios for free viewing on YouTube and Crunchyroll, explores the anime subculture in North America with footage from anime conventions and interviews with fans, voice actors and artists.
- "I'm a Fanboy", a 2009 episode of the MTV series True Life, focusing on fandom and cosplay.
- Fanboy Confessional, a 2011 Space Channel series that featured an episode on cosplay and cosplayers from the perspective of an insider.
- Comic-Con Episode IV: A Fan's Hope, a 2011 film about four attendees of San Diego Comic-Con, including a cosplayer.
- America's Greatest Otaku, a 2011 TV series where contenders included cosplayers.
- Cosplayers UK: The Movie, a 2011 film following a small selection of cosplayers at the London MCM Expo.
- My Other Me: A Film About Cosplayers, chronicling a year in the life of three different cosplayers: a veteran cosplayer who launched a career from cosplay, a young 14-year-old first-timer, and a transgender man who found himself through cosplay. It was released in 2013 and was a featured segment on The Electric Playground.
- Heroes of Cosplay, a reality show on cosplay that premiered in 2013 on the Syfy network. It follows nine cosplayers as they create their costumes, travel to conventions and compete in contests.
- "24 Hours With A Comic Con Character", a segment from CNNMoney following around a known cosplayer while she prepared for and attended New York Comic Con.
- WTF is Cosplay?, a reality show that premiered in 2015 on the Channel 4 network. It follows six cosplayers throughout their day-to-day lives and what cosplay means to them.
- Call to Cosplay, a competition reality show that premiered in 2014 on Myx TV. It is a cosplay design competition show where contestants were tasked to create a costumes based on theme and time constraints.
- Cosplay Melee, a competition reality show on cosplay that premiered in 2017 on the Syfy network.
- Cosplay Culture, a 90 minutes documentary that follows cosplayers during preparation and conventions in Canada, Japan and Romania. Includes a visit of Akihabara (Japan), a geek Mardi Gras parade in New Orleans and a historic overview explaining the origin of cosplay.

=== Other media ===
- Cosplay Complex, a 2002 anime miniseries.
- Downtown no Gaki no Tsukai ya Arahende!!, a Japanese TV variety show that includes the Cosplay Bus Tour series segment.
- Super Cosplay War Ultra, a 2004 freeware fighting game.
- A large number of erotic and pornographic films featuring cosplaying actresses; many of such films come from the Japanese company TMA.

== Cosplay groups and organizations ==
- 501st Legion
- Rebel Legion

== See also ==
- Anime and manga fandom – Fan community
- Costumed performer – Meetable or cartoon costumed performers
- Escapism – Mental diversion from unpleasant or boring aspects of life
- Fan labor – Activities done by fans of a work
- Furry fandom – Subculture interested in anthropomorphic animals
- Japanese pop culture in the United States
- Japanese street fashion – Contemporary Japanese fashion trends
- List of cosplayers
- Lolita fashion – Fashion subculture originating in Japan
- Real-life superhero – Person dressing up in a superhero costume
- Sexual roleplay – Sexual and other interactions of people playing type roles
- Zombie walk – Public gathering

== Bibliography ==
- Lunning, Frenchy (2022). Cosplay: The Fictional Mode of Existence. Minneapolis, MN: University of Minnesota Press. ISBN 9781517912154.
