= Chicago newspaper strike of 1912 =

Labor strike in Illinois, US

The Chicago Newspaper strike of 1912 was a strike that ran from May until November. It was primarily held by the pressmen, and supported by other unions such as the stereotypers. The pressmen union attempted to bring attention to conglomerate newspaper publishers' attempts at breaking up printing unions.

== Hearst takes over ==
William Randolph Hearst had opened up two newspapers in Chicago: an evening edition the Chicago American, and a morning edition the Chicago Examiner. Hearst Management had signed a joint contract for five years covering the printers, stereotypers, pressmen, engravers, and mailers. All but the pressmen were part of the International Typographical Union; the pressmen belonged to the International Printing Pressmen and Assistants' Union of North America.

In 1905 Hearst Management renewed an agreement separately with each organization for another five years. In 1910 at the contract's expiration the pressmen and other printing trade unions were made aware that Hearst Management wanted to come under the agreement with the Chicago Chapter of the American Newspaper Publishers' Association (ANPA), because they more favored Management, but the pressmen resisted the notion of joining the ANPA

== Contract expires ==
In 1912 the Web Pressmen's Union No. 7 contract with the Hearst papers expired, and they requested a wage increase. Hearst Management and the union could not come to an agreement, so they entered arbitration with the Chicago Board of Trade's president Harry Wheeler, which resulted in a reduction of wages by 20-30%, in order to be more congruent with the prevailing wages of other Chicago newspapers. They also increased work hours, and Wheeler failed to give direction on the presses crew sizes, which allowed Hearst to downsize the press from ten men to eight men. This crew reduction was the direct cause of the strike.

== Strike or lockout? ==
On April 30, 1912, the Hearst management posted an announcement in their pressrooms that they had chosen to come under contract between the Web Pressmen's Union and the Chicago Chapter of the ANPA. At the direction of union leadership, the pressmen continued to work. On May 1 Hearst Management posted that the contract would now reduce the men on the press from ten to eight men without having this approved by neither the union nor its members. At this announcement the men refused to work and walkout.

Hearst Management stood by their contracts, and contended the pressmen broke their contracts by working the night, and then walking out in the morning. Instead, they urged the pressmen to file a formal complaint through an arbitration process. George L. Berry, the president of the International Printing Pressmen and Assistants' Union came to Chicago to lead the pressmen strike and encouraged other unions to join.

A dispute arose between Berry and Hearst Management whether this was to be a strike or a lockout. Hearst stood behind the contract that stated, "The employer shall in each case determine the number of men to be employed," where Berry argued that the rest of the clause stated that "each decision shall be open to question by the union should he hereafter reduce the number below that he now employs on the press without at the same time adopting some additional labor-saving devices, attachment or improvement."

== Joining the strike ==
The Chicago Newspapers stood with Hearst and locked pressmen out. Only the Scripps-McRae Day Book and the socialist newspapers kept their contracts with the pressmen. Web Pressmen Union No.7 were locked out, and also stripped of the bargaining rights with Chicago publishers. On May 3, 1912, the Stereotypers' Union No.4, The Delivery and Mail Drivers' Union, and the Newsboys Union joined the walkout.

The International Stereotypers' and Electrotypers' Union of North America did not sanction the strike and ordered the local Chicago Stereotypers' Union No. 4 back to work, while Union No.4 did not want to work with scabs or under police protection.

The Typographical Union No. 16 were pressured into joining the strike, and put it to a vote on May 19, 1912, but voted to remain on the job and honor their existing contracts. Berry saw that as a blow to side with the publishers that "are bending every means to disrupt the organizations they have locked out." The Chicago Federation of Labor stood behind the pressmen strike and on June 2, 1912, they called out Union No. 16 for staying on the job.

The publishers continued to stand behind Hearst and placed the blame on the pressmen for breaking their contracts and not using the proper recourses for challenging the contract. Police were used to protect those willing to work on the presses by enforcing the distribution of papers. Violence erupted, caused by the special guards hired by the publishers, and resulted in four deaths and others seriously wounded.

== The strike continues ==
Samuel Gomers called a meeting of the three major printing trade unions: pressmen, stereotypers, and typographers. Both local and national officers were in attendance, including John Fitzpatrick, president of Chicago Federation of Labor. Berry presented the pressmen's' grievances, and the typographical union defended their stance in not joining the strike. Gompers met with the publishers in order to start negotiations of the strike, but the publishers would not deal with the pressmen.

Berry attempted to widen the strike but was rejected. Also, the conditions of New York would not allow for a strike, even though they would want that strike to "force a settlement in Chicago". At the convention, Berry was warned about extending the strike to all Hearst papers, because they would not be able to hold out against Hearst.

The AFL called for an end to the pressmen strike and once again attempted to negotiate with the publishers, which they declined. The strike ended in November with the newsboys and delivery drivers back to work. The stereotypers signed a new contract with the Chicago publishers. The pressmen were left alone in the strike while the jobs were filled by nonunion pressmen.
