= Cosmode =

Japanese cosplay magazine

COSMODE - COSplay MODE Magazine
- Categories: Costume, Cosplay
- Founded: 2014
- Company: Shimsam Media Co., Ltd.
- Country: Japan
- Language: Japanese
- Website: Cosmode official site (Japanese)

COSMODE - COStume MODE Magazine
- Categories: Costume, Cosplay
- Frequency: Quarterly
- Publisher: Eichi Publishing
- Founded: 2002
- Final issue: 2014
- Company: Inforest
- Country: Japan
- Language: Japanese

COSplay MODE Magazine (COSMODE) is a Japanese-language magazine about cosplay.

== History and profile ==
COSMODE (COStume MODE Magazine) was started in 2002. It was published by Eichi Publishing on a quarterly basis. Each issue contained color images of cosplayers from conventions and various events. It also included information and hints on costume construction, hair styling, makeup and other cosplay-related tips.

In 2008, COSMODE Online, a digitalized English version of COSMODE magazine, was created in response to the growing cosplay culture.

On 15 April 2014 the last issue of COSMODE was published and the parent company, Inforest, was also closed.

However COSplay MODE Magazine replaced it starting in August 2014 and continues to be regularly released and sold under the COSMODE name.
