= Mr. Skygack, from Mars =

1907–1911 comic strip by A.D. Condo

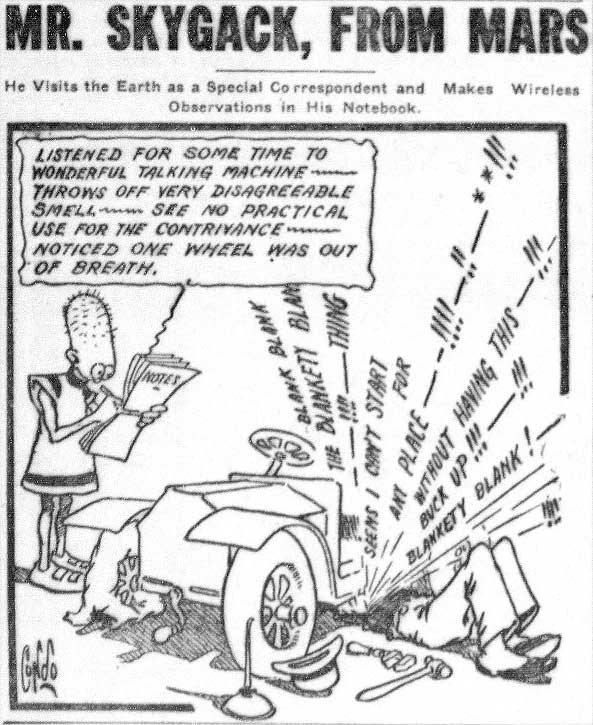
The 18 October 1907 panel of Mr. Skygack, from Mars

Mr. Skygack, from Mars was a comic strip by the American cartoonist A. D. Condo. It appeared in the Chicago Day Book, a Chicago working-class newspaper, from October 2, 1907, to April 1911 in about 400 comic strips and single panels. Like much of Condo's work in this period, the Mr. Skygack feature was syndicated and appeared in many other papers, including The Seattle Star, The Milwaukee Journal, The Spokane Press, The Pittsburgh Press, The Tacoma Times and The Duluth Daily Star.

The comic followed the titular Mr. Skygack, a Martian, on his mission to study humans. Mr. Skygack's comical misunderstandings of Earthly affairs gave Condo the opportunity to comment on and criticize social norms. Skygack subsequently appeared as a regular character in Condo's ethnic-humor comic strip Osgar und Adolf. 'Osgar und Adolf' was itself the basis for a theatrical production which included Skygack as a character; it was described by Gertrude Gordon in The Pittsburgh Press as a 'rousing good comedy'.

In 1914, 'Osgar Und Adolph', still incorporating Skygack as a regular character, was drawn by a cartoonist signing themselves 'Macdonald'. Between 1921 and 1922 the character was revived in his own right, once again in a single-panelled strip reporting on everyday American life, by another cartoonist, 'Lavery'.

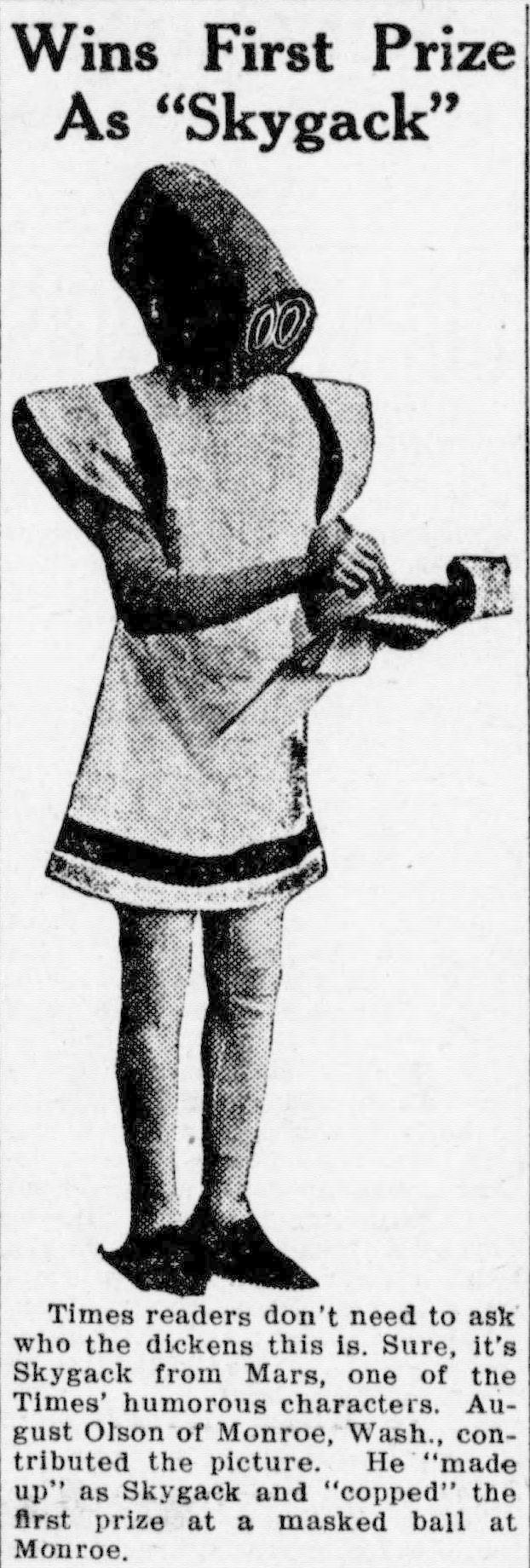
A Mr. Skygack costume of 1912

Mr. Skygack, from Mars is considered by many to be the first science fiction comic, and the first in comics history to feature an extraterrestrial character. It also gave rise to the first recorded sci-fi cosplay when a Mr. William Fell was reported wearing a Mr. Skygack costume to a 1908 masquerade.

In 1923, James W. Dean's syndicated column posited that 'Martian' characters with 'overdeveloped heads' played by Margaret Irving and Grant Mitchell in the film M.A.R.S. (later known as Radio-Mania) were 'evidently... influenced by the old comic drawn by Condo, "Mr. Skygack from Mars."'
