= The Outbursts of Everett True =

American comic strip

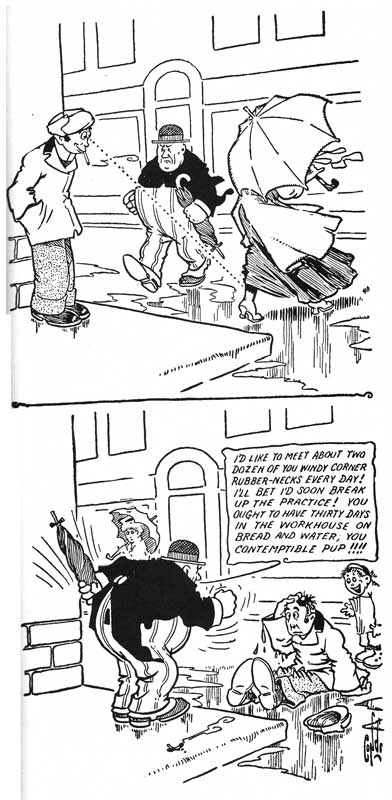
Everett True beats a youth for ogling a woman's ankle.

The Outbursts of Everett True (originally titled A Chapter from the Career of Everett True) was an American two-panel newspaper comic strip created by A. D. Condo and J. W. Raper that ran from July 22, 1905 to January 13, 1927, when Condo had to abandon it for health reasons. Two contemporary collections appeared in 1907 and 1921, and it was the Newspaper Enterprise Association's "most popular feature".

== Characters and story ==
The original strip revolved around an ill-tempered man in late middle-age who was typically dressed in a suit and bowler hat of antiquated and comical appearance for the time. Without his hat he was completely bald. In the early cartoons he was moderately stout, but in the later ones he became increasingly portly. He often smoked a short cigar.

The first panel of each strip generally had someone inconveniencing or annoying True, an innocent bystander, or an animal. In the second panel he would then make an ill-tempered outburst. In early cartoons this was usually an uninhibited rant which expressed what other people wanted to say, but were too polite to. Sometimes it was accompanied by comments from bystanders in speech-bubbles ("that's the way I like to hear a man talk"; "I wish I could hand out one like that"). Later cartoons were more slapstick in character. True would exact his revenge by either berating or (if confronting a man) pummelling the offender. The only character who occasionally turned the tables on True was his wife, who appeared occasionally to berate or beat him for some unacceptable behavior.

== Adaptations ==
The American Bioscope Company made a series of silent short movies featuring Everett True, the first of which, Everett True Breaks Into the Movies, was released in 1916, starring Robert Bolder as Everett and Paula Reinbold as Mrs. True.

== Legacy ==
Writer August Derleth hailed Everett True as the first comic strip character aimed at adults and a personal favorite of his. He spent five years during the 1940s attempting to track down the retired A. D. Condo to get his permission to reprint a selection of 300 strips as a book. Finding him in a nursing home in Oakland, California, Derleth got Condo to draw new Everett True strips for the first time in decades for the book, one of which was printed in the Madison Capital Times on November 28, 1948. In 1953, Derleth told the Capital Times that he was still working on the book and remained in contact with Condo, whose "fingers no longer respond so well" but still wanted to draw one last strip showing True confronting Senator Joseph McCarthy. Derleth's book was never published.

Subsequently, aside from an appearance in Alley Oop in 1969, the strip was largely forgotten for the better part of the century. In 1983, however, one of the collections was reprinted, and comic book writer Jenny Blake Isabella and various artists employed the character in a new strip for the Comics Buyer's Guide and The Comics Journal. In this modernization, Everett True directed his outbursts at comic book artists, writers, publishers and distributors. In 2015, a new collection was published under the title Outbursts of Everett True with an introduction by Trevor Blake.
