= A. D. Condo =

American cartoonist (1872–1956)

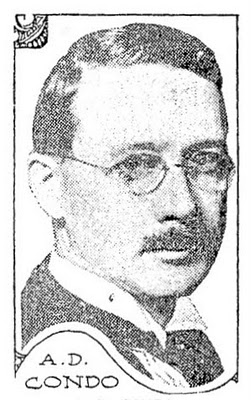
A.D. Condo, circa 1917

Armundo Dreisbach Condo (September 19, 1872 in Freeport, Illinois – 24 August 1956 in Albany, California) was an American cartoonist best known as the creator of the comic strip The Outbursts of Everett True.

== History ==
Condo first joined the newspaper industry in the 1880s, working as a printer's devil. In 1896, the Toledo News hired him as an editorial cartoonist as a direct response to the William Jennings Bryan presidential campaign. He subsequently worked for the Cleveland Press, and was then contracted to the Press's owner, the Newspaper Enterprise Association, where he created The Outbursts of Everett True.

== Other works ==
Condo's other works included "Diana Dillpickles", "Osgar und Adolf" (1911-1915, ethnic humor), and "Mr. Skygack, from Mars" (1907-1912, often described as the first science fiction comic strip).

The last comic strip to feature Condo's byline was published in 1946; however, a one-off Everett True strip was published in the Madison Capital Times in 1948 to illustrate a story about August Derleth tracking down Condo in a California nursing home. Derleth was compiling 300 of his favorite Everett True cartoons for publication in a book which was to feature more new strips by Condo. In 1953, Derleth told the Capital Times that he was still working on the book and remained in contact with Condo, whose "fingers no longer respond so well" but still wanted to draw one last strip showing True confronting Senator Joseph McCarthy. Derleth's book was never published.
