= List of real-life superheroes =

Real life super heroes and groups

Real-life superheroes wear masks or otherwise disguise themselves in order to perform deeds ranging from community services to deterring crime. Some examples documented in the news media include:

== Argentina ==
- Menganno works on the east side of Lanús. He wears blue clothing, a helmet, and a shield similar to that of fictional superhero Captain America, but with the colours of the Flag of Argentina.
- Spiderman of Buenos Aires, the Spiderman of Buenos Aires patrols the outskirts of the city helping children with social projects and reporting crimes to the police.

== Australia ==
- Wearing specially made black knife-resistant clothing and wearing a black mask, Black Rat of Sydney carries a utility belt and backpack containing a fire blanket, fire extinguisher, first aid kit and drinking water. He has campaigned for better lighting in the streets and more community involvement in neighbourhoods.
- Captain Australia, featured in the mX and then The Courier-Mail and on television's A Current Affair, is based in Brisbane, Queensland. Police have expressed their preference that Captain Australia not intervene in incidents.

== Canada ==
- Polarman of Iqaluit, Nunavut, shovels snow off sidewalks and keeps playgrounds safe for children during the day and patrols the streets for criminals at night, wearing a black balaclava, white pants and snow boots.
- Ark of Toronto was featured in an article for Postmedia News by Douglas Quan in November 2011, who commented on his reasons and methods on being a real-life superhero.
- The Crimson Canuck of Windsor, Ontario, was also featured in the article by Quan, as well as being interviewed on the radio station AM800 by Arms Bumanlag, and was featured in an article in the Toronto Sun.
- Thanatos of Vancouver, British Columbia, dresses in a trench-coat, skull-and-crossbones tie, and wide-brimmed hat while wearing a bulletproof vest as he distributes goods and goodwill to the homeless.
- The Katalysts Ontario, also known as the Justice Crew of Oshawa, in Oshawa, Ontario, are a collection of individuals who patrol the streets at night, clean up local litter, and perform homeless outreach. Members include its founder Aftershock, Regulus, and the Nameless Crusader.
- Lightstep is a masked patroller currently located in Montreal. He is equipped with a bulletproof vest and a bag with first aid kit, needle collection containers, latex gloves, condoms, socks, gloves and hats.

== China ==
- Chinese Redbud Woman assists the poor in Beijing, China. She has been seen several times wearing black tights and a blue mask, handing out food and warm clothing to the homeless.

== Colombia ==
- Wearing a mask, Super Pan fights against hunger by handing out bread three days a week in poverty stricken areas of Bucaramanga.

== Finland ==
- Dex Laserskater has been patrolling the streets of Helsinki since 1997. He has modeled his alter ego after the short lived comic book hero Skateman. He specializes in guiding tourists, tipping waiters, doormen and street musicians and helping the police.

== France ==
- Captain Ozone has featured in the French Max magazine, the Koikispass magazine, and the German edition of the FHM magazine.
- The Defenders of France have been the subject of numerous press articles. L'Arpenteur (English: The Surveyor) is one of their leaders.

== Israel ==
- Park Wayne is a superhero active in Jerusalem. His outfit and identity are mostly inspired by Batman and Spider-Man. He has roamed the streets of the city protecting drunks, people at risk, and the creative communities in Jerusalem since 2010. He was featured in an episode of The State of Jerusalem that followed him for a night in order to shed light on him.

== Italy ==
- Entomo, the Insect-Man, is a masked patroller and activist who has been inspired by earlier real-life superheroes. In February 2009, Rai 4 filmed a night-time patrol and interview with Entomo at an abandoned factory in Naples, aired on the TV program Sugo. Following an interview on Il Riformista, Entomo was depicted in Panorama.

== Japan ==
- In 2015, various media reported that Kamen Rider No.1 based on the eponymous character patrols the streets of Kitakyushu, Fukuoka Prefecture, while looking for drunk drivers. Identity of the real-life Kamen Rider turned out to be Shinjiro Kumagaya, an environmental artist.

== Mexico ==
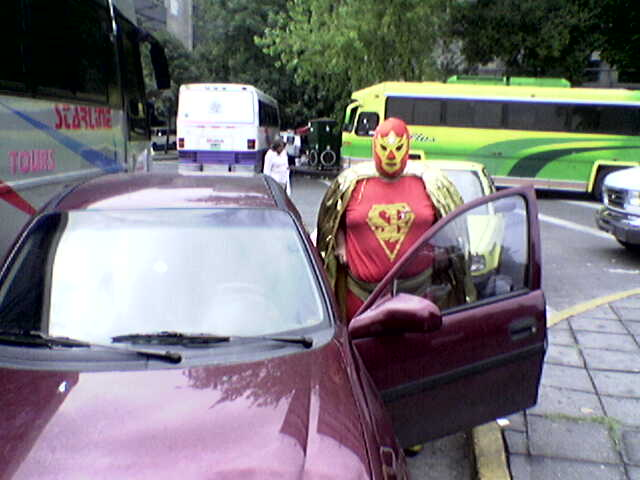
Superbarrio Gómez of Mexico City

- CNN covered Mexico City's Superbarrio Gómez, who is a celebrity, satirist, and organizer who wears red tights and a red and yellow wrestler's mask. He uses his unique image to organize labor rallies, protest, and file petitions to prevent families from being evicted.

There is also a Mexican Batman

== Sweden ==
- Väktaren (English: The Watchman) patrols the streets of Malmö, wearing a dark suit with a white mask and white "V" symbol on his chest. When interviewed, the police stated that as long as he was not impersonating a police officer, he was not breaking any laws.

== United Kingdom ==
- The BBC reported on Angle-Grinder Man, a British self-described "wheel-clamp superhero" who claims to use an angle grinder to illegally cut wheel clamps off vehicles which have been clamped in by police and parking officials in Kent and London. Police indicate that they have received no word or complaint of his actions.
- The newspaper This Is Local London featured an article on SOS (whose real name is Steve Sale), a UK superhero who gatecrashed the premiere of the film Kick-Ass in April 2010.
- The Statesman is a super hero who patrols the streets of Birmingham wearing a mask, Union Jack shirt and dark trousers. Reports of his effectiveness are mixed.
- In August 2011, the BBC reported on Shadow (whose real name is Ken Andre) who patrols in Yeovil.
- A vigilante known as the Bromley Batman has been seen by several witnesses to have saved people from knife-wielding gangs and muggers in South London. His activities have been reported as far as Cornwall.

== United States ==
Real-life superheroes are notably prevalent in the USA compared to other countries, which may be attributed to the greater popularity of superhero comic books.

- One of the earliest examples of a RLSH was California's Richard Allen Pesta, alias Captain Sticky. Starting around 1974, clad in a blue jumpsuit with gold cape and boots and driving the "Stickymobile" he campaigned against abuses in nursing homes, supplied information on health insurance frauds to authorities, and advocated for consumer rights. He testified before the Federal Trade Commission hearings in 1978 and Congress in 1979 wearing his uniform. He was arrested in 1986 when he rented his house to a film crew shooting pornography.
- Tothian and Ecliptico were both featured in the special features of the 2009 Watchmen film, titled Real Superheroes, Real Vigilantes.
- Master Legend assists the homeless of Orlando and is a member of the Justice Crusaders. Amazon based the 2017 black comedy series Legend of Master Legend on his super hero persona.
- Batman of San José advocates for the homeless in San Jose, California.
- Shadow Hare wears a mask and cape and patrols Milford, Ohio, armed with tasers, pepper spray and handcuffs.
- Captain Ozone has starred in PSAs, made appearances at grade schools and hemp festivals, created a video documentary on environmentalism, and organized a public demonstration for renewable energy.
- Phoenix Jones is a mixed martial artist who patrols Seattle, Washington in search for criminal activity in a bulletproof vest and stab plating. Initially wearing a ski mask to intervene in a public assault, Jones later developed a full costume and adopted the pseudonym.
- Mr. Xtreme, a security guard, spends his free time as a costumed crime fighter handing out food and juice in San Diego, California.
- Captain Oyster, whose real name is Liam Davenport, patrols his Queens neighborhood looking for late-night crimes to solve through "intimidation and intellectual discourse".
- Crimson Fist patrols Atlanta twice a month with his wife, Metadata, to help the homeless in their area.
- Wall Creeper and Zen Blade patrol in Denver.
- The Watchman and Moon Dragon were reported patrolling Milwaukee in 2009.
- Terrifica is a New York City-based woman who patrols bars and parties in an effort to prevent inebriated women from being taken advantage of by men. Since the mid-1990s, she has donned a mask, blonde wig, red boots and cape, because, in her words, women "need to be protected from themselves".
- In 2010, The Viper was stopped by police in Columbia, Tennessee, for patrolling the streets after midnight in a black and green mask and costume. He claimed that he was "just a guy trying to do what was right in tights".
- The Bay Coast Guardians is a group in St Petersburg, Florida that conducts safety patrols and homeless outreach events since 2017. The team consists of members Warden, Mercy, Jaguar, Good Samaritan, Impact, and Miracle. The BCG is also partnered with the Not-for-profit The super Foundation
- Dragonheart is a bilingual real-life superhero who operates in Miami.
- In Portland, Oregon, Zetaman patrols the streets in a minivan, giving help to the homeless. (Ret.)
- Dark Guardian of New York, whose real name is Chris Pollak, has patrolled the streets of New Jersey and New York since the age of 19. In 2017, he became the head of the Guardian Angels, a volunteer crime prevention organisation.
- The Eye of Mountain View in California is a licensed investigator. His specialty is patrolling using homemade gadgets to record criminal activity so that it can be reported to police. He often works with his wife, Lady Mystery.
- Squeegeeman "fights grime and crime" in Manhattan wearing a red mask and cape. He was reported as making a mock run for president in 2008.
- Stormbringer was one of the original 2010-2011 Rain City Superheroes. He was one of the few who managed to keep their identity secret, with very little known except that He wore a Black and Red suit made up of octagonal patches made out of Kevlar. It has been reported he has staged fights to boost popularity of the team.
- The Demon Warrior in Sacramento, California, investigates demonic forces.
- Skyline is an anonymous real life superhero and martial-artist operating in Albuquerque, New Mexico, performing community patrols, donating food, de-escalating street fights, and documenting police/ICE interactions. Skyline has cultivated a large online following on platforms like TikTok.

== Russia ==
In Russia, there have also been attempts to create their own real superheroes.

- In March 2011, the first Russian superhero, nicknamed the "Chelyabinsk Ninja" (Челябинский Ниндзя), appeared in Chelyabinsk. However, nothing more was known about this superhero and there were no new news or rumors about him.
- In Saint Petersburg in September 2011, a superhero nicknamed "Petersburg Man" (Человек-Петербург) appeared, who helped people get on the right path and demanded that people throwing out cigarette butts on the streets take their own trash to the trash can. This superhero also had his own page VKontakte, which at that time had more than three thousand subscribers who could contact him through the group and ask him for help. Unfortunately, this superhero did not exist for long and there were no more rumors or news about him.
- In 2014, a new superhero appeared in Chelyabinsk, nicknamed "Cleanman" ("Chistoman" (Чистомэн)), whose real identity is Artur Matis-Sirazeev. This superhero is not known for fighting crime and violators, but for fighting against environmental pollution and garbage. He continues to check his hometown and clean it from garbage, as well as organize online meetings so that his subscribers and fans can also help him fight against garbage, for several years now. Cleanman also has his own motto: “It’s not clean where Cleanman cleans, but where no one litters.”
- In 2016, a superhero nicknamed "Grim Reaper" appeared in Khimki, who was similar in costume and behavior to Batman, although Grim Reaper himself claims that the similarities with Batman are coincidental. In addition, he has his own Twitter, where he comments on his actions and communicates with people. This superhero calls himself "the first superhero of humanity", although in fact this is not true.

== Real-life superhero groups ==
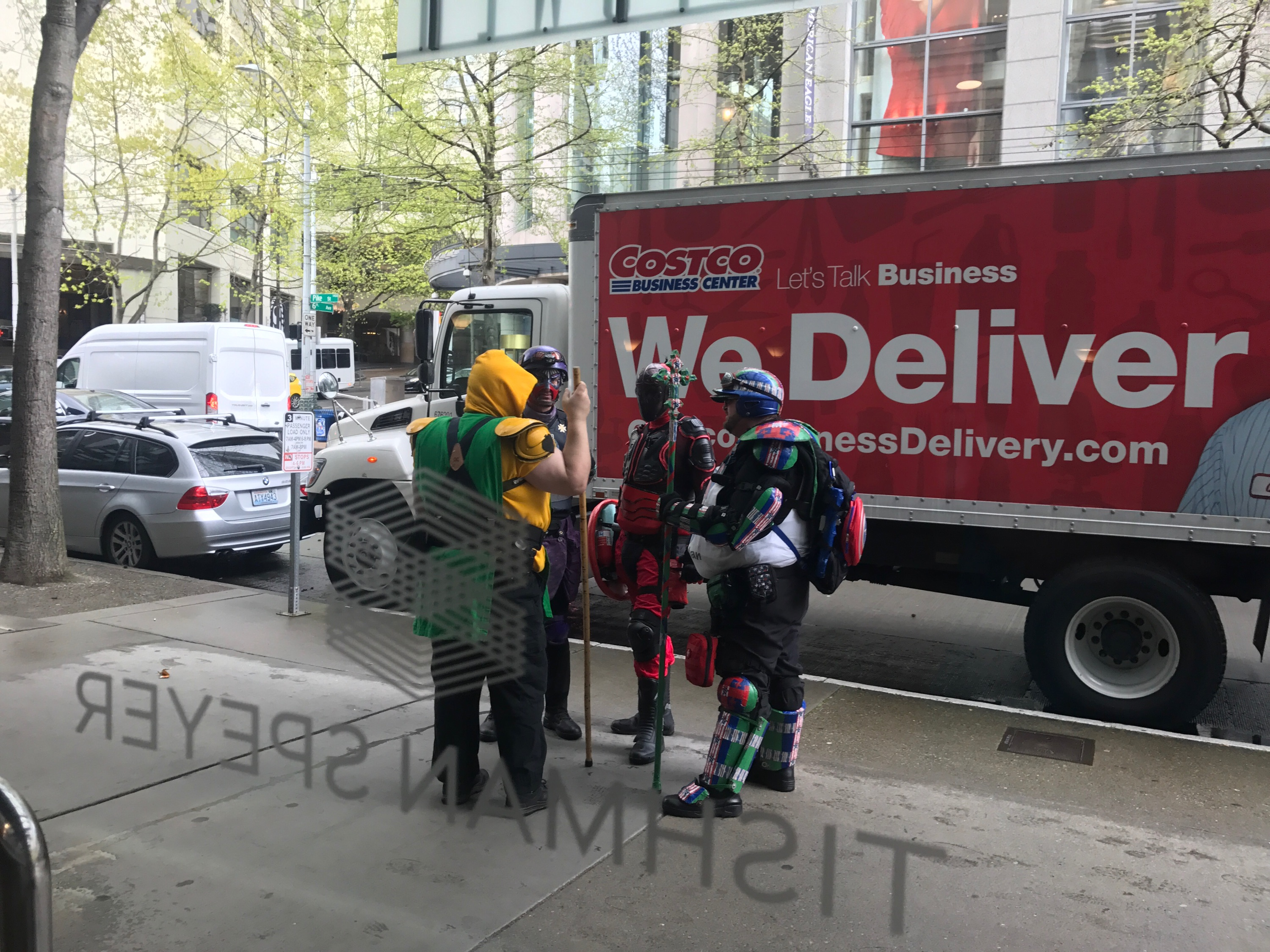
SkyMan, Red Ranger, El Caballero, and Dragon (members of Emerald City Heroes Org, or ECHO) monitoring the 2017 May Day protests in Seattle.

=== United States ===
There are several organized groups of real-life superheroes in the United States.

- A group of real-life superheroes from all over the United States, called Superheroes Anonymous, held their first meeting near Times Square in New York City on October 28, 2007. Along with filming a documentary and giving interviews to news media, they patrolled New York City.
- The Rain City Superhero Movement, a former group of real life super heroes in Seattle. The group includes Buster Doe, Stormbringer, No Name, Troop, Penelope, and Phoenix Jones.
- Real-life superheroes Captain Prospect, Justice, and Sparks are members of the Capital City Super Squad in Washington D.C.
- Central Florida News 13 did a story on Team Justice, a group of costumed superheroes giving Christmas gifts to the homeless.
- Salt Lake City Weekly reported on the patrols of The Black Monday Society and the superhero identities of its team members Insignis, Ghost, Ha!, and Silver Dragon. Fox News Salt Lake City ran a story on the team as well.
- The Jibsheet ran an article about a group of ten real-life superheroes in Seattle trying to help the homeless prevent their belongings from being stolen by gangs.
- KSTP-TV reported on Razorhawk, Geist, and the Great Lakes Hero Guild while they patrolled Minneapolis. The segment was re-broadcast nationally on ABC Overnight News.
- The Xtreme Justice League, founded in 2006 by Mr. Xtreme, regularly patrols San Diego. Their duties include homeless outreach, safety patrols and attempting to de escalate fights. A registered non profit, they work with the local community and the police, and have featured in several news stories.
- A Thrillist article on the world's first superhero training center called The Superhero Foundry in Las Vegas was published in August 2018. The group, called the Guardians of Tomorrow, is a citywide neighborhood watch group created to address the concerns of mass shootings and felony crimes after the 2017 Las Vegas shooting that happened across from the Mandalay Bay during a country music concert.
- The Starlight Children's Foundation, a nonprofit organization founded in 1982, Los Angeles, California, has their own mascot, Captain Starlight, which is also played by one in Markham, Ontario, Canada, and in Naremburn, New South Wales, Australia, which is played by multiple roles of men and women.

=== United Kingdom ===
- A group of four men in Liverpool, calling themselves Black Mercer, Knight Warrior, Radical, and Templar, were featured in an August 2018 Liverpool Echo article.
