= List of cosplayers =

Cosplay, short for "costume roleplay", is an activity in which participants wear costumes and accessories to represent a specific character or idea from a work of fiction.

== Notable cosplayers ==
Name	Image	Known for	Country	Refs.
†Forrest J Ackerman		Science-fiction author, magazine editor, and cosplayer known for his "futuristicostume".	United States	
Akari Akase		Singer, model, and cosplayer.	Japan	
Cherprang Areekul		Thai idol, cosplayer, and member of BNK48.	Thailand	
Ayasa		Violinist known for covering songs while wearing cosplay.	Japan	
AzzyLand		Canadian YouTuber focusing on gaming and cosplay-related content.	Canada	
Leva Bates		Professional wrestler known for wrestling while wearing cosplay.	United States	
bbno$		Rapper, singer, and songwriter also known for cosplay.	Canada	
Marie-Claude Bourbonnais		Glamour model known for cosplaying as Frost from Mortal Kombat.	Canada	
Mica Burton		Actress, gamer, and cosplayer.	United States	
Jade Cargill		Professional wrestler.	United States	
Holly Conrad		Internet personality.	United States	
Randy Constan		Professional impressionist known for cosplaying as Peter Pan.	United States	
Eugenia Cooney		YouTuber and Twitch streamer that makes content about fashion, makeup, and cosplay.	United States	
Adrianne Curry		Model and TV personality; first winner of the America's Next Top Model.	United States	
Francesca Dani		Net idol and model known for cosplaying as anime characters, first appearing as Sailor Moon.	Italy	
Belle Delphine		YouTuber and pornographic model known for erotic cosplay.	South Africa	
Chloe Dykstra		Cosplayer, model, and actress.	United States	
Emiru		Twitch streamer and cosplayer.	United States	
Enako		Cosplayer, voice actress, and former idol.	Japan	
F1NN5TER		Online streamer and YouTuber known for cross-dressing.	United Kingdom	
Anna Faith		Instagram model known for Cosplaying as Elsa from Frozen.	United States	
Folkenstal		Cosplay artist known for highlighting the weapons and armors of The Elder Scrolls Online.	Switzerland	
Sweetie Fox		Pornographic film actress, model, and cosplayer; won a Pornhub Award for "Favorite Cosplayer".	Russia	
Ari Gameplays		Internet celebrity, streamer, YouTuber, TikToker, model, and cosplayer.	Mexico	
Katie George		American cosplayer.	United States	
Alodia Gosiengfiao		Model, artist, singer, and recording artist. Award winning cosplayer, known for playing various characters.	Philippines	
Gibi ASMR		ASMR performer, YouTuber, Twitch streamer, and cosplayer.	United States	
Connie Glynn		Author, YouTuber, and cosplayer.	United Kingdom	
Giovanna Grandón		Teacher, activist, and politician known for participating in the 2019 Chilean protests while cosplaying as Pikachu.	Chile	
GypsyCrusader		White supremacist known for live streaming while wearing cosplay of characters such as the Joker.	United States	
Kat Gunn		Professional gamer, Twitch streamer, broadcast analyst for IGN, and internet personality.	United States	
Yaya Han		Model and costume designer, featured on SyFy channel's Heroes of Cosplay and the TBS reality show King of the Nerds.	United States	
Moeka Haruhi		Professional wrestler, gravure idol, and actress known for cosplay.	Japan	
Angela Hill		Professional mixed martial artist who has appeared in cosplay before fights.	United States	
Sica Ho		Singer, actress, and cosplayer.	Hong Kong	
April Hunter		Retired professional wrestler, boxer, actress, and model.	United States	
Liz Katz		Model, actress and cosplayer.	United States	
Kayane		Esports player and journalist.	France	
Keekihime		Livestreamer, YouTuber, singer, and cosplayer.	Austria	
Hideaki Kobayashi		Cosplayer known for cross-dressing in a Japanese schoolgirl uniform	Japan	
Mari Kotani		Feminist literary critic and cosplayer.	Japan	
Linda Le		Cosplayer, model, costumer, artist, Internet personality.	United States	
Riki LeCotey		Cosplayer, specialty costume maker, main cast member of Syfy series Heroes of Cosplay.	United States	
AJ Lee		WWE wrestler known for dressing up as pop culture characters.	United States	
Monika Lee		Cosplayer; appeared on Heroes of Cosplay.	United States	
Lilia Lemoine		La Libertad Avanza politician, conspiracy theorist, cosplayer, and makeup artist.	Argentina	
Liyuu		Singer and cosplayer.	China	
Putri Nony Lovyta		Cosplayer, model, and fashion designer based in Jakarta.	Indonesia	
Meagan Marie		Cosplayer and creative professional in the video game industry.	United States	
Dax Martin		Drag queen and cosplayer.	United States	
Jay Maynard		Computer programmer and system administrator known as "Tron Guy" for his electroluminescent Tron costume.	United States	
†Richard McCaslin		Real-life superhero, Marine, stuntman, and cosplayer known for attempting to raid the Bohemian Grove while dressed as a superhero.	United States	
Megami		Drag queen and cosplayer known for competing on RuPaul's Drag Race.	United States	
Javier Milei		President of Argentina, also known for appearing at comic conventions cosplaying as a superhero persona called "General AnCap".	Argentina	
Hiromu Mineta		Voice actor and cosplayer.	Japan	
Nashiko Momotsuki		Professional cosplayer, actress, model, and licensed practical nurse.	Japan	
†Morojo		American costume designer, science fiction fan and fanzine publisher who in 1939 created the first costumes worn at a science fiction convention, worn by her and Forrest J Ackerman.	United States	
Olivia Munn		American actress, model, television personality, and author.	United States	
Yuichiro Nagashima		Kickboxer and martial artist.	Japan	
Shoko Nakagawa		Tarento, singer, actress, YouTuber, and cosplayer.	Japan	
Neekolul		Twitch streamer and YouTuber.	United States	
Jessica Nigri		Promotional model and cosplayer, known for cosplaying as Juliet Starling from the video game Lollipop Chainsaw.	United States	
Lai Pin-yu		Democratic Progressive Party politician and cosplayer.	Taiwan	
Brittany Lauda		Voice actress and cosplayer.	United States	
Kenny Omega		Professional wrestler.	Canada	
Bella Poarch		TikTok personality.	United States	
Reona		J-pop and anison singer.	Japan	
Stacey Roy		Actress and television producer.	Canada	
Myrtle Sarrosa		Singer and actress; winner of Pinoy Big Brother: Teen Edition 4.	Philippines	
Adam Savage		Special effects artist, television personality, and cosplayer.	United States	
Seo Yu-ri		Actress and video jockey.	South Korea	
Kaho Shibuya		Former AV idol.	Japan	
Hikaru Shida		Professional wrestler, martial artist, model, and actress.	Japan	
Brinke Stevens		Model, actress, and scream queen. First winner of the Masquerade Ball at San Diego Comic-Con.	United States	
Anucha Saengchart		Thai cosplayer and social media personality.	Thailand	
Vishavjit Singh		American cartoonist known for cosplaying as his character, "Sikh Captain America".	United States	
Kaitlyn Siragusa		Internet celebrity, YouTuber, pornographic model, and cosplayer.	United States	
Tanya Tate		English glamour model, writer and pornographic actress.	United Kingdom	
Meg Turney		Internet personality and video game journalist.	United States	
Yuriko Tiger		Model and actress.	Italy	
Zelina Vega		Professional wrestler.	United States	
Julia Voth		Actress and model who provided the likeness for Jill Valentine in a number of Resident Evil video games.	Canada	
Yaorenmao		Singer and dancer that posts videos on Bilibili and YouTube.	China	

† indicates that the person is deceased.

== See also ==
- List of real-life superheroes
