= Chrysalis School (Woodinville, Washington) =

Private school in Washington, United States

- Chrysalis

Location
- 15900 Woodinville-Redmond Rd NE; Woodinville, King County, Washington 98072; United States; 47°45′45.49″N 122°9′0.67″W

Information
- Type: Private school
- Motto: All children deserve school success.
- Established: 1983
- Director: Karen L. Fogle (founder)
- Faculty: 36 (as of 2026)
- Enrollment: Approximately 150 (as of 2026)
- Color
- Mascot: Butterfly
- Website: Chrysalis School

Chrysalis School is a private school in Woodinville, Washington, serving grades K–12 at two campuses.

As of 2026, the school graduates approximately 35 students per year. 76% of their students enroll in college upon graduation and 24% go directly to work or take a gap year.

== History ==
Karen L. Fogle founded the Chrysalis School in her home in 1983. The school has been accredited since 1995 and is currently accredited through Cognia.

== Notable alumni ==
- Megan Hilty, actress
- Phoenix Jones, member of Rain City Superhero Movement
- Brett McClure, Silver Medalist in gymnastics in the 2004 Olympics
- Yina Moe-Lange, alpine ski racer in the 2010 Winter Olympics
- Christian Niccum, luger in the 2006 and 2010 Winter Olympics
