= Katie George =

Katie George may refer to:

- Katie George (cosplayer) (born 1988), American cosplayer
- Katie George (cricketer) (born 1999), English cricketer
- Katie George (sportscaster) (born 1993), American sportscaster
