= SiliCon =

Pop-culture technology convention in the U.S.

Coordinates: 37°19′43″N 121°53′20″W

SiliCon with Adam Savage
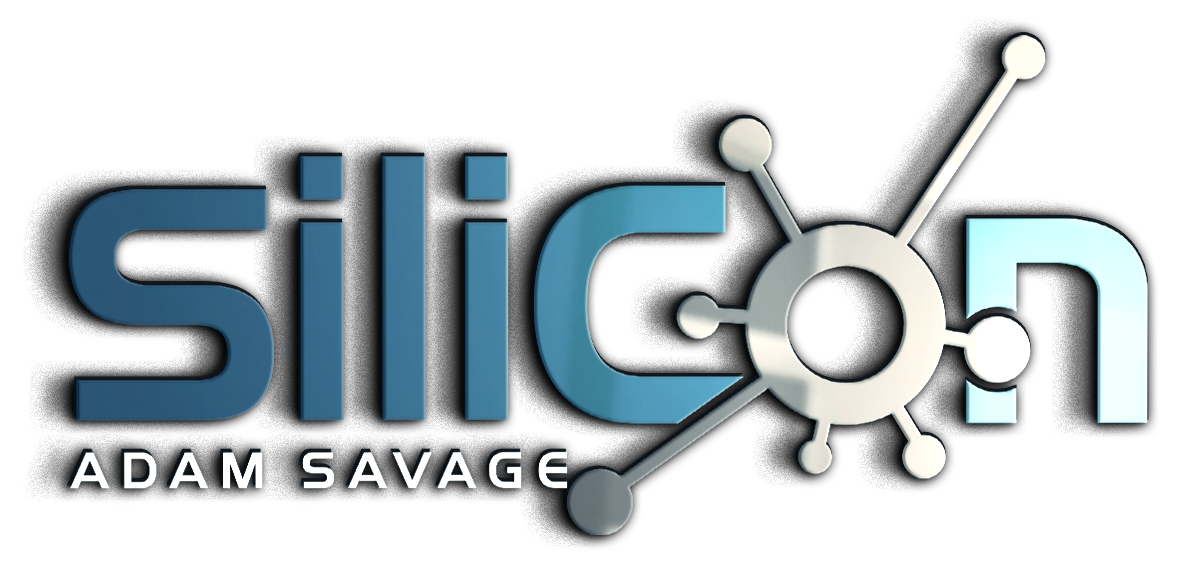
- Status: Active
- Genre: Multi-genre
- Venue: San Jose Convention Center
- Location: San Jose, California
- Country: United States
- Inaugurated: 2016 (as Silicon Valley Comic Con)
- Most recent: 2022
- Leader: Adam Savage
- Website: www.siliconsj.com

SiliCon with Adam Savage (formally Silicon Valley Comic Con) was an annual pop culture and technology convention, at the San Jose Convention Center in San Jose, California. The convention was founded by Steve Wozniak, Stan Lee and Rick White. The inaugural event was held March 18–20, 2016 at San Jose's McEnery Convention Center. The convention was rebranded as SiliCon in early 2020 and Adam Savage appointed as the creative director. It was canceled after the 2022 event.

== History ==
Silicon Valley Comic Con was first announced April 17, 2015 through an online video featuring Steve Wozniak and Stan Lee. The aim was to bring together popular culture touchstones such as comics, movies, genre TV and technology together as one convention. Including panels featuring creative artists, writers, actors, directors, producers, and science communicators.

Silicon Valley Comic Con will be the San Francisco Bay Area's first large multi-genre convention since the departure of WonderCon after that convention's 2011 show. Since WonderCon's departure the largest convention left in the Bay Area had been Big Wow! Comicfest, which is being added to Silicon Valley Comic Con's schedule.

On July 13, 2016, the second annual event was confirmed to be occurring April 21–23, 2017 at the San Jose Convention Center as well as expanding into several additional venues nearby.

On February 20, 2020, the convention was renamed SiliCon, and Adam Savage was named the new creative director. The 2020 event was to have taken place October 16–18 at the San Jose Convention Center, but the COVID-19 pandemic forced officials to move to a virtual show.

The SiliCon 2023 was cancelled and the convention was discontinued, with the organizers alluding to the continued impact of the COVID-19 pandemic and funding issues. In 2024, a different comic con, GalaxyCon, debuted at the San Jose Convention Center.

== Features and events ==
The convention aimed to include both popular culture and technology in what Wozniak hopes will be a uniquely Silicon Valley flavor. In that spirit, the convention had typical comic convention staples such as an "artists alley", but it also had an "app alley" featuring new and emerging technology items. Several movie and television studios were represented at the inaugural event including Warner Bros. Pictures, Lionsgate and AMC. Additionally several technology-focused guests were involved as well including astrophysicists and technologists.

== Convention locations ==
Dates	Location	Attendance	Guests
March 18–20, 2016	San Jose Convention Center; San Jose, California	60,000	Steve Wozniak, Stan Lee, William Shatner, Jeremy Renner, Ray Park, Nathan Fillion, Alan Tudyk, Christopher Lloyd, Astro Teller, Jon Heder, Michael J. Fox, Lea Thompson, Tim Miller, Vic Mignogna, Nichelle Nichols
April 21–23, 2017	San Jose Convention Center, City National Civic, The California Theater; San Jose, California	65,000	Steve Wozniak, William Shatner, Grant Gustin, Tom Felton, Billy Boyd, Steven Yeun, John Cusack, Gina Torres, Adam West, Burt Ward, Gary Fisher, Buzz Aldrin, Anjali Bhimani, Kari Byron, Ming Chen, Chad Michael Collins, Denise Crosby, Gigi Edgley, Robert Englund, Jackie Dallas, Jonathan Frakes, Matt Frewer, Pam Grier, Sam J. Jones, Chase Masterson, Gates McFadden, David Newell, Nichelle Nichols,
April 6–8, 2018	San Jose Convention Center; San Jose, California	70,000	David Tennant, Krysten Ritter, Christina Ricci, Mads Mikkelsen, Ian McDiarmid, Freema Agyeman, Temuera Morrison, Daniel Logan, Chris Kattan, Martha Higareda, Katee Sackhoff, Ray Park, Nichelle Nichols, Adam Savage, Stan Lee, Sean Astin, Andy Weir, Jewel Staite, Dean Devlin, Judy Greer, Matthew Lewis, Kevin Eubanks, Mae Jemison, Michio Kaku, Roger Penrose
August 16–18, 2019	San Jose Convention Center; San Jose, California		Arnold Schwarzenegger, Jason Momoa, Chris Hadfield, Will Wright, Jim Cummings, Adam Savage, Robert Patrick, Edward Furlong, Ben McKenzie, Julie Benz, Lou Ferrigno, Andy Weir
August 28–29, 2021	San Jose Convention Center; San Jose, California		Adam Savage, Lou Ferrigno, Andy Weir, Jake Roberts, Mark Sheppard, Catherine Coleman, William Shatner
August 27-28, 2022	San Jose Convention Center; San Jose, California		Adam Savage, Kari Byron, Tory Belleci, Summer Glau, Batman of San José, George Takei, Ray Park, Eric Basaldua

== See also ==
- 2016 in comics
