= Putri Nony Lovyta =

Indonesian cosplayer and model

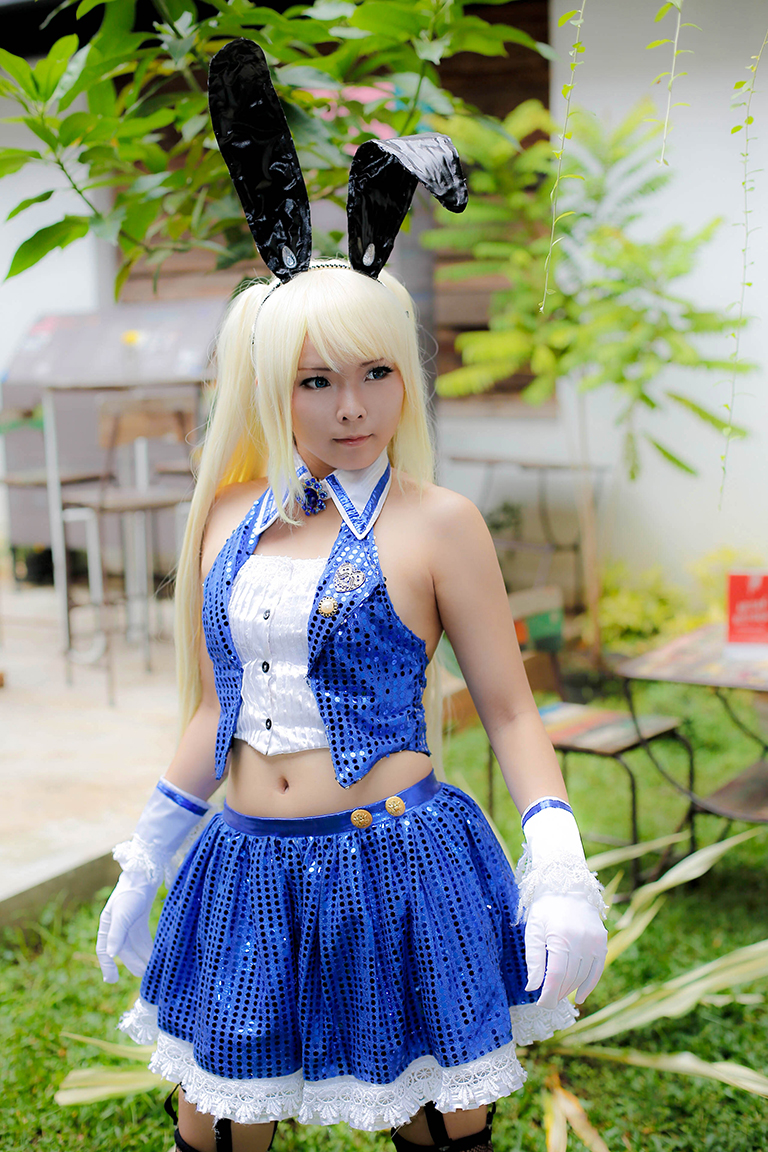
- Yukitora Keiji as Marie Rose from Dead or Alive 5 Ultimate
- Born: 12 August 1997 (age 29); Bekasi, Indonesia
- Citizenship: Indonesia
- Occupations: Cosplayer, Fashion Designer
- Years active: 2004–present (Modeling); 2004–2008 (Acting); 2007–2009 (Singing); 2007–2009 (Dancing); 2009–present (Cosplaying); 2016 (Illusionist); 2017–present (Fashion Designer)
- Spouse: Stefanus Edwin Surya Kanda (m. 2021)
- Parent: Franselina Luana Tedjowinoto (Mother)
- Modeling information
- Height: 1.6 m (5 ft 3 in)
- Hair color: Dark Brown
- Eye color: Dark Brown

Alexandria Maria Putri Nony Lovyta (born 12 August 1997), also known as Yukitora Keiji (雪虎慶次), is an Indonesian cosplayer, model, and fashion designer based in Jakarta. She is a regular judge at cosplay competitions and has been featured in various magazines, newspaper also TV shows locally and abroad. Yukitora was featured on the Net.Tv channel's Go Show, and became Tokyo Game Show 2014 Indonesia Cosplay Representative. In August 2020 she launch lifestyle brand "YKTR12".

== Personal life ==
Putri Nony Lovyta lives in Jakarta, Indonesia, Her mother is the one who gave her the nickname Yukitora; Yuki (雪) means snow and tora (虎) means tiger. Yukitora attended Regina Pacis Elementary School; Tarsisius 2 Junior High School; Tarsisius 1 High School; and LPTB Susan Budihardjo, where she graduated in 2017 as a fashion designer, and launched her lifestyle brand YKTR12. Yukitora became involved in the entertainment world supported by her mother and grandmother starting from 2004 as a young model and actress, then from 2007 she took classes at Purwacaraka Music Studio for vocal courses and Dream Team Choir Member, also in the same year she took classes at Interlude Dance Studio for salsa and belly dance. In 2009 she started her journey as a cosplayer.

== Cosplaying ==
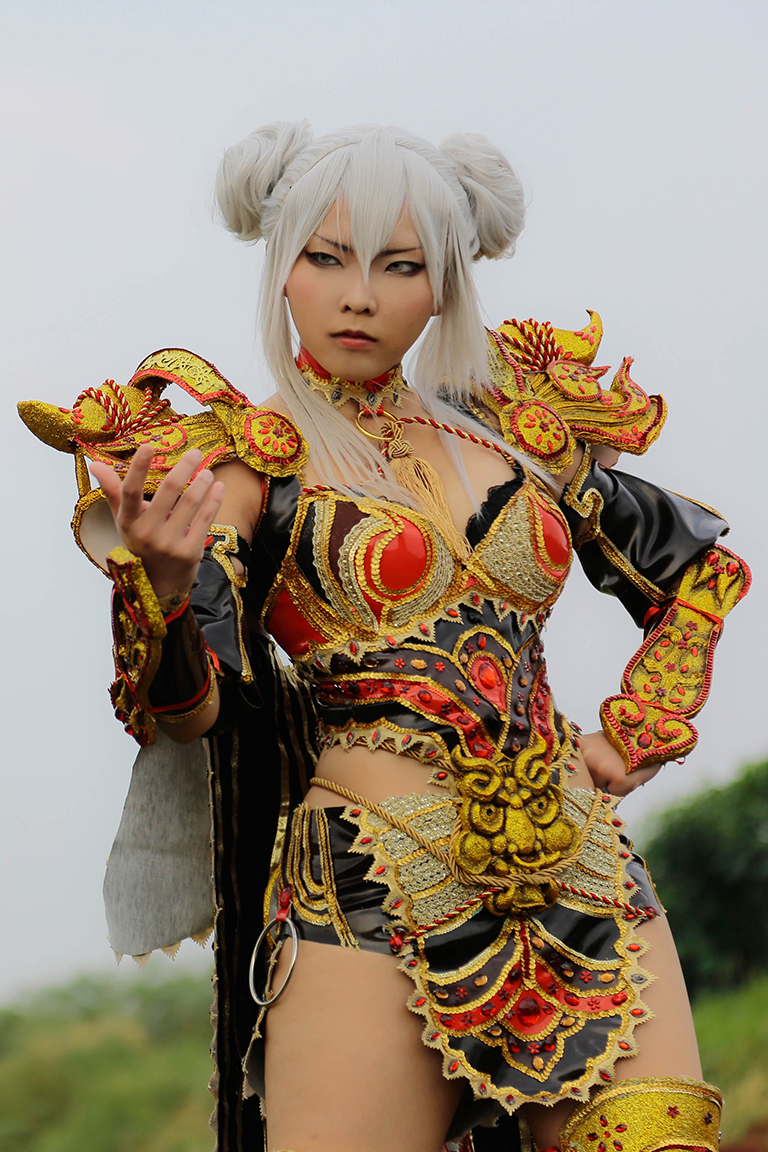
Yukitora Keiji as Asta

Yukitora became involved in cosplay after contacting other anime and video game enthusiasts. Encouraged by her friends, she started cosplaying in 2009 at the age of 11, joining various competitions in Jakarta. Her first cosplayed character was a Seth Nightroad from Trinity Blood at Animax Cosplay Competition 2010. She won first place in the WCG Cosplay Competition 2010 Category Anime / Manga as Seth Nightroad from Trinity Blood. being featured on the cover of Issue 170 of ANIMONSTAR a Manga Magazine in the Indonesia. Since then, she cosplayed a series of characters from over 40 anime, movie and video game titles including: Dead or Alive 5 Last Round, Dead or Alive Xtreme 3, K Project, and Sengoku BASARA, As a multi-awarded cosplayer, she is appearing at conventions and judging competitions locally and abroad. She started judging at the age of 14.

=== International appearances ===
After participating in the cosplay community in Indonesia, Yukitora Keiji was invited into various cosplay conventions and events as a participant, performer, judge or to attend as a guest. In November 2014 at Makuhari Messe in Japan, Yukitora, represented Indonesia as one of the Guest for the Tokyo Game Show Cosplay Collection Night. Yukitora cosplayed as Empress Sp Gunner Armor from the Monster Hunter Frontier Generations Game.

== Illusionist ==
Yukitora began performing as an Illusionist on 2016 after encouragement from her teachers Russel Rich, Jiban & Emon and Darius Drew. She performed her first magic show at Go Show Net.Tv channel; she was also the winner from Cycle 1.

== Endorsements, media and press ==
Her achievements in the cosplay community led her way to be recognized by the mainstream media and various companies in Indonesia. Currently Became one of the 2017 brand ambassador of a Pop Culture clothing line Jongen, and in 2014 became a brand ambassador for Qeon Interactive latest game Weapons of Mythology.

Past endorsements include many companies such as Qeon Interactive, Istana Boneka, and Buzzbuddies. Yukitora was chosen as Official Cosplayer for Disney BIG HERO 6 Hiro Hamada by Istana Boneka, ASTA Online: The War of Tears and Winds from Qeon Interactive, Donita from Unlight, Sasha from Artoncode Vandaria Saga: Winterflame and also Queen of Pain from Defense of the Ancients 2 for World of Gaming event by Kairos Event Management.

== See also ==
- List of cosplayers
- Cosplay
