= Crossplay =

Crossplay may refer to:

- Cross-platform play, across video game systems
- Crossplay (cosplay), cross-gender costume play
- Crossplay, a 2026 mobile game by The New York Times Games
