= Tone Jewel =

Japanese girl group

TJ
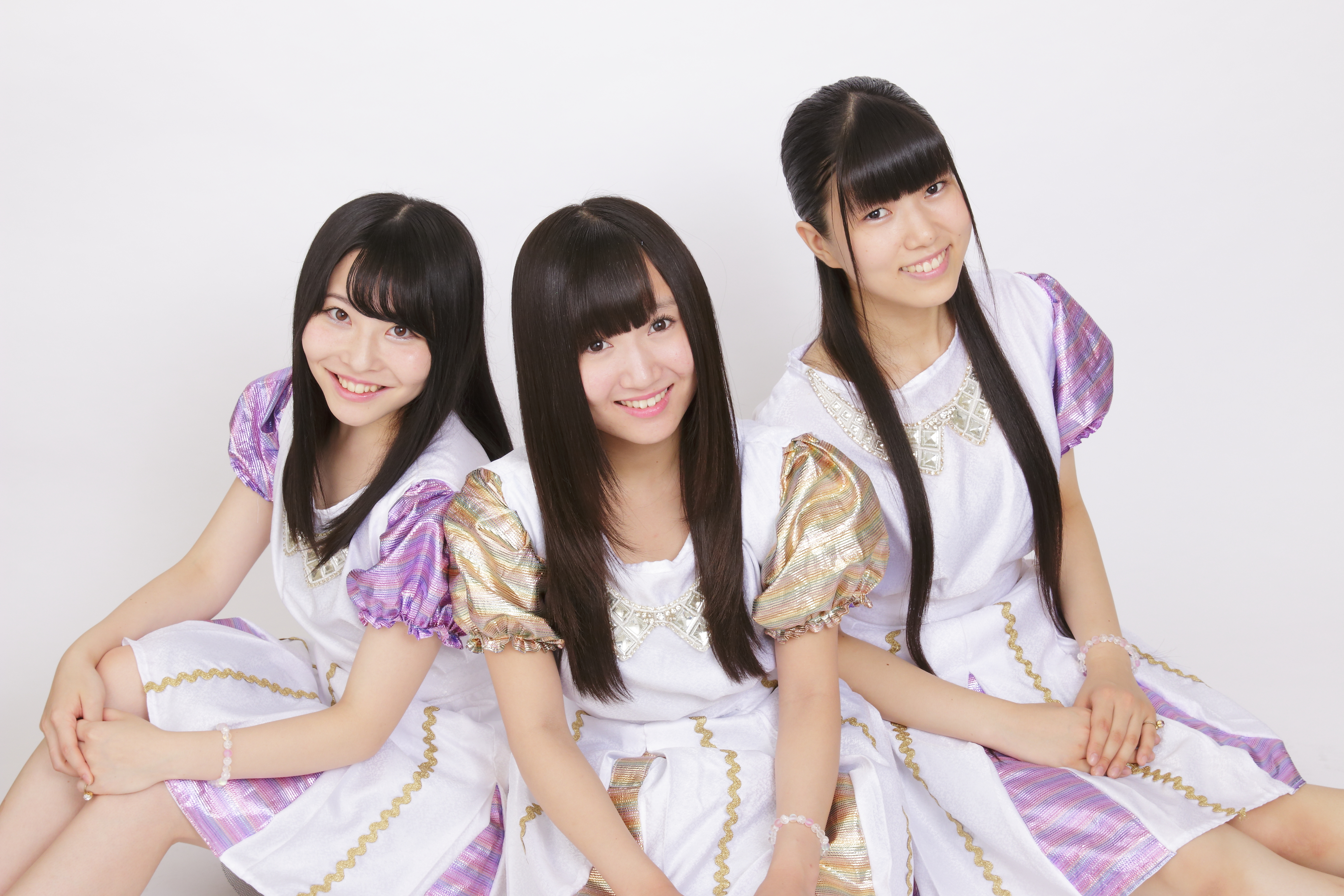

Background information
- Also known as: Tone Jewel (トーンジュエル) (2012-2014); Tone Jewel Research Students (トーンジュエル研修生)
- Origin: Tokyo, Japan
- Genre: J-pop
- Years active: 2012-present
- Labels: FlyingStar Records (2012); Stellar Jewel Records (2013); Crown Beats (2015-present)
- Members: Kana Machimura; Hinano Takayama
- Past members: Chihiro Ayase; Riko Kayama; Kana Sakura; Keekihime Yumi; Saki Takimura; Miyabi Hazuki; Momoka Miyashita; Moeka Morimoto; Ayane Yokoniwa; Yūki Itonaga
- Website: www.tjproject.tokyo

TJ (トーンジュエル, Tōn Jueru; previously written as Tone Jewel) is a Japanese idol girl group. The group was originally formed in 2012 by Victor Entertainment and have been performing independently since 2013. To reflect the group's name and concept, the members perform with microphones attached to the jewel on their pinky rings.

The original member line-up made their major label debut with the extended play Kimiiro Note in 2012 and later released the song "Blooming Song" in 2013.

== History ==
=== 2012–2013: Debut ===
Tone Jewel was formed by Victor Entertainment in 2012. To reflect the group's name and concept, the members performed with wireless microphones attached to their pinky rings. With the lineup consisting of Kana Sakura, Riko Kayama, and Keekihime Yumi, Tone Jewel was marketed as a trio of "hardcore otaku" high school girls and built a fanbase on Niconico. Keekihime, an Austrian native, had been recruited through an online audition held by Victor Entertainment and prior to joining, she was a vlogger on Niconico. The group first recorded music independently for a Touhou Project fan project. Their first extended play, Sistars Trip, was sold exclusively at Comiket 82 on August 11, 2012, with the cover artwork drawn by Keekihime. Tone Jewel made their major label debut on August 22, 2012, with the extended play Kimiiro Note, featuring "Kimiiro Inryoku" as the promotional track. After the release of the song, Kayama departed from the group. In a 2023 Instagram post, Keekihime states that, after this, Tone Jewel was dropped from Victor Entertainment and they performed as an independent group.

On December 30, 2012, Tone Jewel released their first studio album, Meguru Kiseki, independently and sold it exclusively at Comiket 83, with the album illustration provided by Keekihime. Sana Takimura was later recruited as a second generation member. In 2013, Tone Jewel released their debut single, "Blooming Song", which was produced by Arte Refact.

At the end of 2013, Sakura left the group due to family reasons. Later that year, Keekihime and Takimura also departed from the group due to Keekihime's visa issues, which had limited her performances.

=== 2014–present: Line-up and name changes ===
Miyabi Hazuki, Momoka Miyashita, and Chihiro Ayase, three girls who had previously been recruited into the group as research students (trainees), began performing under the name Tone Jewel Research Students under independent labels. After several member line-up changes, Tone Jewel was renamed and also established sister groups, such as End of Silence, Twist Jewel, and Tradition Jack.

On March 22, 2024, Chihiro announced that she was retiring from the group.

== Members ==
=== Current members ===
- Kana Machimura (町村かな)
- Hinano Takayama (高山緋奈乃)

=== Former members ===
- Chihiro Ayase (彩瀬千聖) (2014-2024)
- Riko Kayama (嘉山璃子) (2012-2013)
- Kana Sakura (沙倉香奈) (2012-2014)
- Keekihime Yumi (ケーキ姫☆優海) (2012-2014)
- Sana Takimura (瀧村咲菜) (2013-2014)
- Miyabi Hazuki (菜月雅美)
- Momoka Miyashita (宮下桃歌)
- Moeka Morimoto (森元萌香)
- Ayane Yokoniwa (横庭綾音)
- Yūki Itonaga (糸永有希)

== Discography ==
=== Studio albums ===
| Title | Year | Details | Peak chart positions | Sales |
| Title | Year | Details | JPN | Sales |
|---|---|---|---|---|
| Meguru Kiseki (メグルキセキ) | 2012 | Released: December 30, 2012; Label: —; Format: CD; Track listing: 1. "Meguru Kiseki" (メグルキセキ); 2. "Winter Holy Days"; 3. "Precious X'mas"; 4. "Awayuki Memory" (淡雪メモリー); 5. "Ni-jigen Kareshi" (二次元☆カレシ); 6. "Mayonaka Fanfare" (真夜中ファンファーレ); 7. "Mayoi Yuki no Sora" (迷い雪の空); 8. "Haru wa Mijikashi Koise Yo Otome!" (ハルは短し恋セヨ乙女！) | — | — |
"—" denotes releases that did not chart or were not released in that region.

=== Extended plays ===
==== Major ====
| Title | Year | Details | Peak chart positions | Sales |
| Title | Year | Details | JPN | Sales |
|---|---|---|---|---|
| Kimiiro Note (キミイロノート) | 2012 | Released: August 22, 2012; Label: Victor Entertainment; Format: CD; Track listing: 1. "Summer Party!!" (サマー☆パーティー！！); 2. "Mirai Mirai" (ミライ∞ミライ); 3. "Kimiiro Inryoku" (キミイロインリョク); 4. "Sugarless Memory" (シュガーレスMEMORY); 5. "Yūzora Triangle" (夕空トライアングル); 6. "Kokoro Note" (ココロノート); 7. "Girl's Manifesto" | — | — |
"—" denotes releases that did not chart or were not released in that region.

==== Indie ====
| Title | Year | Details | Peak chart positions | Sales |
| Title | Year | Details | JPN | Sales |
|---|---|---|---|---|
| Sistars Trip | 2012 | Released: August 11, 2012; Label: —; Format: CD; Track listing: 1. "Koika Moyō" (恋花模様); 2. "Hōkago Kōjō Iinkai" (放課後向上委員会); 3. "Neverland" (ネバーランド); 4. "Candy Street" | — | — |
"—" denotes releases that did not chart or were not released in that region.

=== Singles ===
| Title | Year | Peak chart positions | Sales | Album |
| Title | Year | JPN | Sales | Album |
|---|---|---|---|---|
| "Blooming Song" | 2013 | 105 | — | Non-album single |
"—" denotes releases that did not chart or were not released in that region.
