= Shadow Hare =

American vigilante superhero

- Born: c. 1987 (age 38–39); Milford, Ohio, U.S.
- Education: Martial arts training
- Occupation: real-life superhero
- Years active: 2005–(c.)2010
- Organization: Allegiance of Heroes

Shadow Hare (or Shadowhare) is the pseudonym of a vigilante superhero who operated in Cincinnati, Ohio from 2005-(c.)2010. He stated that he lived in Milford, Ohio. Wearing a handmade black suit with a stylized hare on the front, along with a cape and mask, he patrolled the streets looking for crimes in progress, and gave out meals to the homeless. Although not supported or endorsed by the Cincinnati Police Department, he cooperated with police, making citizen's arrests when necessary.

Shadow Hare claimed to be skilled in Shōrin-ryū and mixed martial arts, and carried mace, a taser, and handcuffs.

Shadow Hare was injured—he once received a dislocated shoulder while assisting a woman who was being robbed. He frequented Cincinnati public events, especially ones he suspected may turn violent, using his tagline "I see the shadows of shadows." He received international internet and television news coverage, ranging from supportive to mocking. The Milford chief of police was wary, saying "He's putting himself in jeopardy for something he's not trained for.... We don't want people to get hurt." But Shadow Hare continued his activities until at least 2009, stating, "If I have to save someone else in an alleyway, or if there is someone right now who needed my help, I will rush in and give my life."

== Allegiance of Heroes ==
Shadow Hare was part of the "Allegiance of Heroes", a group that included masked crime-fighters calling themselves Eclyptico, Wall Creeper, and Master Legend. He patrolled Cincinnati either alone or with a few other members of the Allegiance, distributing business cards to those interested. At times he traveled to work with local superheroes in other cities, such as Mr. Xtreme in San Diego; according to Shadow Hare, the two attempted to identify and locate a rapist.

== Disappearance ==
In early 2011, television journalist Brian Hamrick investigated Shadow Hare's disappearance from Cincinnati. The journalist revealed that the vigilante had joined a branch of the United States military.
