= Dax ExclamationPoint =

American drag performer and cosplayer

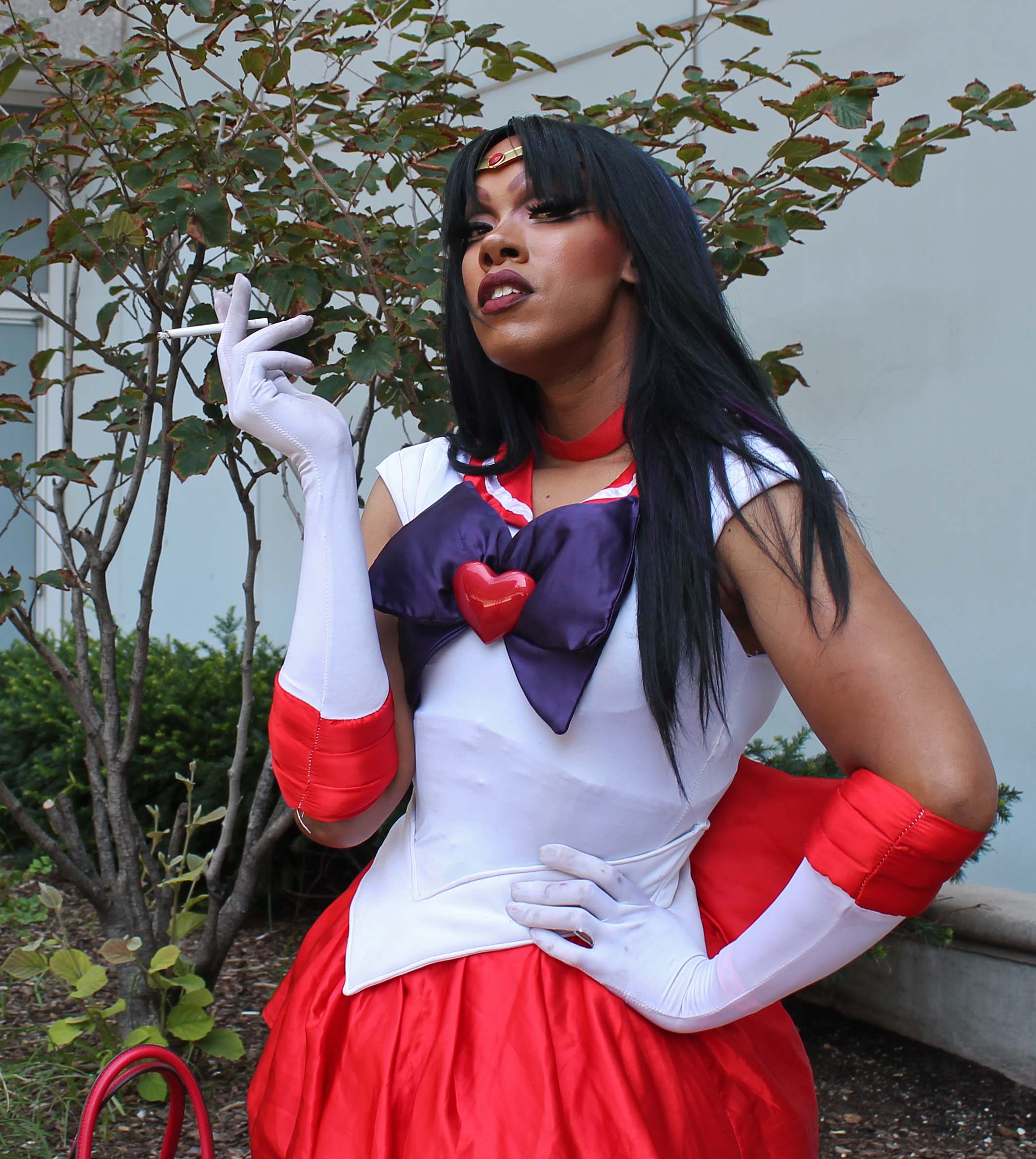
- Dax ExclamationPoint cosplaying as Sailor Mars at Flame Con, 2016
- Born: Dax Martin
- Television: RuPaul's Drag Race (season 8)

Dax ExclamationPoint is the stage name of Dax Martin, a drag performer and cosplayer who competed on season 8 of RuPaul's Drag Race.

== Early life ==
Dax Martin enjoyed comics and watching science fiction and superhero films at a young age.

== Career ==
Dax ExclamationPoint is a drag performer and entertainer. Her looks consist of cosplay. Dax ExclamationPoint is a member of the performance group House of Gunt. She competed on season 8 of RuPaul's Drag Race. Her entrance look was inspired by the Marvel Comics character Storm. She and Laila McQueen were eliminated on the second episode, which featured a musical challenge, after failing to impress RuPaul and judges in a lip-sync to Gloria Gaynor's "I Will Survive" (1978). This was the second time two contestants on the show were eliminated in the same episode.

== Personal life ==
Martin is based in the U.S. state of Georgia. They have lived in Atlanta and Savannah. Martin is non-binary and transgender.

Dax ExclamationPoint is the "drag mother" of Violet Chachki, who won the seventh season of Drag Race. Dax ExclamationPoint has created looks inspired by Chun-li, Lara Croft, Sailor Moon, and Wonder Woman.

== Filmography ==
- RuPaul's Drag Race (season 8)
- Hey Qween!
- Transformations
- Whatcha Packin'

== See also ==
- List of cosplayers
- List of non-binary people
- List of people from Atlanta
- List of people from Savannah, Georgia
