= MomoCon =

Atlanta, Georgia gaming, comics, and anime convention

- Status: Active
- Genre: Gaming, Comics, and Anime
- Venue: Georgia World Congress Center; Omni Hotel Atlanta
- Location: Atlanta, Georgia
- Inaugurated: 2005; 21 years ago
- Most recent: 2026
- Attendance: 67,277 in 2026
- Organizer: Momocon LLC
- Filing status: For-profit
- Website: www.momocon.com

MomoCon is a fan convention held on Memorial Day weekend in Atlanta, Georgia. Founded in 2005, the convention encompasses anime, video games, LARP, webcomics, comics, costuming, cosplay, card games, board games, science fiction and prop armor construction, among other things.

MomoCon was initially held on the campus of the Georgia Institute of Technology. From 2012 to 2014, it was held at Atlanta Mariott Marquis, and since 2015 it has been held at the Georgia World Congress Center. It was originally hosted in March, but moved to Memorial Day weekend in 2014. From 2005 to 2011, there was no entry fee to MomoCon; the convention sold T-shirts and highlight DVDs to fund the next year. Due to rising costs, 2012 was the first year that an admission fee was required.

== History ==
The word "momo" in Japanese means "peach", and its host state, Georgia, being the "Peach State" led to the naming of MomoCon.

Every year, MomoCon has a theme that goes into the design of the convention that year. The first year, it was "Southern Hospitality" and T-shirts were black and featured the MomoCon mascot, as created and drawn by H. M. Ogburn. In 2005, MomoCon was run by an estimated 35 volunteers. The convention had over 30 guests and many special demo teams, as well as several special events and feature movies. An article on the anime club and the convention was featured in the February 2005 issue of Newtype USA, and professionally made commercials were seen around Georgia Tech campus before on-campus movies in the Student Center.

In 2006, T-shirts were black and featured the same MomoCon mascot in a purple kimono in the moonlight, to coincide with the Tsukimi ("moon-viewing") theme. MomoCon 2006 had a convention motto of "Because You Shouldn't Have to Pay for Quality" and featured an opening ceremonies video that was a parody of Iron Chef, with "Chairman Panda" and the "Iron Staff". Key events for 2006 included a Tsukimi festival with kimono-clad wait staff, a Gaming Decathlon, a Pocky Stop cafe, and a rain-cancelled Sidewalk Art competition. Guests included numerous webcomic and comic artists, voice actress Amy Howard Wilson of Star Blazers fame and prop maker Robert "Vaderpainter" Bean.

In 2007, T-shirts were hunter green and featured the MomoCon mascot; the staff theme was "The Family". The video game tournaments were reworked to feature a few large tournaments, as opposed to many smaller tournaments, and a larger costume contest was held at Georgia Tech's Kessler Campanile. The new costume contest location provided seating for a greater number of attendees, and was held earlier in the evening. Local area groups stepped forward to run workshops and seminars on their respective expertise, including a plethora of costuming panels and workshops, Japanese ceremonial demonstrations and game demos. On Sunday (March 18, 2007), the convention was closed nine hours early because several con attendees attempted to set off firecrackers inside the Georgia Tech Student Center.

Because the number 4 is considered unlucky in Japanese culture, MomoCon 2008 (the 4th event) featured a gothic horror-style theme. In addition to several events from past years, 2008's event included a Twilight Tea event, at the end of the day on Sunday, in lieu of a closing ceremony. Con-goers were asked to stop by for some fresh-brewed tea under the light of red paper lanterns at dusk and let the staff know what they would like to see at the event in the future. Due to the security problem in 2007, subsequent MomoCon events (starting with 2008) have required registration to enter. Attendees were required to present a valid photo ID to enter, and children under the age of 16 needed to be accompanied by an adult. Badges were provided, and the event remained free for congoers.

The theme for MomoCon 2009 was retro-campy science fiction. Additional Japanese cultural events were held, including community support from local groups who specialize in these events. The second floor of the Instructional Center building, previously used only for tournaments, was used for additional panel, workshop and anime viewing space. Special events included screenings of public domain science fiction movies from the 1950s and 1960s and a Mechas and Monsters late-night programming block, featuring Kaiju and mecha movies. The first band performance at MomoCon happened in 2009: The Extraordinary Contraptions, a Steampunk-themed rock band.

On April 6, 2020, it was announced that MomoCon, which was scheduled for May 21–24, had been cancelled due to the COVID-19 pandemic.

The next MomoCon was scheduled for May 27–30, 2021, but on February 27, 2021, it was also cancelled due to COVID-19 and "the uncertainty about the future of the entire events industry also pushing events further into the calendar year". A smaller-scale spin-off event known as "Winterfest by MomoCon" was held from 18-19 December 2021, requiring con-goers to wear a mask and provide either a vaccine card or proof of a negative test result.

Policies were changed in 2023 to not require masks or vaccine cards, instead suggesting masks indoors and providing masks to those in need.

=== Event history ===
Dates	Location	Atten.	Guests
March 26–27, 2005	Georgia Institute of Technology; Atlanta, Georgia	700	Amy-Howard Wilson, Robert 'Vaderpainter' Bean, Nightmare Armor Studios, Gamesare, Terminus Media, Kittyhawk, Jennie Breeden
March 18–19, 2006	Georgia Institute of Technology; Atlanta, Georgia	1,800	John Lotshaw, R. Dustin Kramer, Jennie Breeden, Andy Runton, Sith Vixen, Brent Allison, Amy-Howard Wilson, Bill Holbrook
March 17–18, 2007	Georgia Institute of Technology; Atlanta, Georgia	2,600	
March 15–16, 2008	Georgia Institute of Technology; Atlanta, Georgia	4,840	
March 14–15, 2009	Georgia Institute of Technology; Atlanta, Georgia	7,200	
March 20–21, 2010	Georgia Institute of Technology; Atlanta, Georgia	7,800	
March 12–13, 2011	Georgia Institute of Technology, Atlanta Biltmore Hotel and Biltmore Apartments; Atlanta, Georgia	10,300	
March 16–18, 2012	Atlanta Marriott Marquis; Atlanta, Georgia	8,640	Brent Allison, Atlanta Imaginarium, Gina Biggs, Bea Billany, Jennie Breeden, Gamesare, The Gekkos, Go, Robo! Go!, Catherine Jones, Kittyhawk, Harrison Krix, Laugh Out Loud, Wendee Lee, Ellen McLain, Sketch MacQuinor, Penny Dreadful Productions, Bill Winans
March 8–10, 2013	Hilton Atlanta; Atlanta, Georgia	12,200	Brent Allison, Manda Bear, Bea Billany, Steven Blum, Sean Patrick Fannon, Katie George, Jennifer Hale, Yaya Han, Eric Hokanson, Catherine Jones, Sifu Kisu, Eloy Lasanta, Riki "Riddle" LeCotey, Monika Lee, Sketch MacQuinor, Mark Meer, Lindze Merritt, Marin Miller, Cara Ann Murray, Meredith Placko Mike Reiss, Zachary Rich, Mark Zoran.
May 23–25, 2014	Hilton Atlanta, Marriott Marquis; Atlanta, Georgia	14,600+	Brent Allison, Troy Baker, Dante Basco, Courtnee Draper, Katie George, Jess Harnell, Sifu Kisu, Harrison Krix, Maurice LaMarche, Cherami Leigh, Tress MacNeille, Bryce Papenbrook, Rob Paulsen, Leo "That Sci-Fi Guy" Thompson, Doug Walker, Rob Walker, Mark Zoran.
May 28–31, 2015	Georgia World Congress Center, Omni Hotel Atlanta; Atlanta, Georgia	22,600	Brent Allison, Jon Bailey, Jennifer Barclay, Bea Billany, Ashly Burch, Chalk Twins, Keith David, Steve Downes, Crispin Freeman, Katie George, Charlene Ingram, Ke Jiang, Harrison Krix, Mega Ran, Lindze Merritt, Amanda C. Miller, Marin Miller, Professor Shyguy, The Protomen, Doug Walker, Greg Weisman, Sarah Anne Williams
May 26–29, 2016	Georgia World Congress Center, Omni Hotel Atlanta; Atlanta, Georgia	28,300	Brent Allison, Irene Bedard, Bea Billany, Steven Blum, brentalfloss, Zach Callison, Chalk Twins, Mr. Creepy Pasta, Jim Cummings, Benjamin Diskin, Caleb Hyles, Catherine Jones, Harrison Krix, Riki "Riddle" LeCotey, Allyssa Lewis, Mary Elizabeth McGlynn, Erica Mendez, Matthew Mercer, Marin Miller, Mandy "AmazonMandy" Moore, Yad-Ming Mui, Nolan North, Paige O'Hara, Laura Post, Cree Summer, The Runaway Guys, David Vincent, Doug Walker, Adam WarRock
May 25–28, 2017	Georgia World Congress Center, Omni Hotel Atlanta; Atlanta, Georgia	31,132	Brent Allison, Bit Brigade, Zach Callison, Charlet Chung, Mr. Creepy Pasta, Jonny Cruz, Michaela Dietz, Josh Grelle, Samantha Inoue-Harte, Taliesin Jaffe, Jerry Jewell, Catherine Jones, Harrison Krix, Maurice LaMarche, Brendan LaSalle, Allyssa Lewis, Matthew Mercer, A New World, Rob Paulsen, Marisha Ray, The Runaway Guys, Fred Tatasciore, J. Michael Tatum, Mark Zoran.
May 24–27, 2018	Georgia World Congress Center, Omni Hotel Atlanta; Atlanta, Georgia	35,400	Akidearest, The Anime Man, Troy Baker, Bit Brigade, brentalfloss, Kimberly Brooks, SungWon Cho, Richard Epcar, Crispin Freeman, Barbara Goodson, Haiden Hazard, Caleb Hyles, Catherine Jones, Christopher Jones, Josh Keaton, Harrison Krix, Monika Lee, Josh Martin, Carey Means, Misty/Chronexia, Nolan North, Octopimp, Chris Parson, Chris Rager, Arnie Roth, Chris Sabat, Sean Schemmel, Emily Schmidt, Justin Sevakis, SUDA51, The Triforce Quartet, Kari Wahlgren, Hiromi Wakabayashi and Elise Zhang.
May 23–26, 2019	Georgia World Congress Center, Omni Hotel Atlanta; Atlanta, Georgia	> 39,000	Adam Bryce Thomas, A7L PROPS, Adam Nusrallah, Adriana Figueroa, Amy Chu, April Borchelt, Ronald B. Seaman Jr. (Aracknoid3 Cosplay), Asheru, BeeNerdish, Benjamin Byron Davis, Bit Birgade, Brain ScratchComms, Brendan J. LaSalle, Brenden Fletcher, Caleb Hyles, Carolina Ravassa, Casey Renee Cosplay, Catherine Jones (GSTQ Fashions), Charles Martinet, Chris Miller, Cosplay Collective, CutiePieSensei, DAGames, Dan Salvato, Dave Silva, David and Alex Harmer, Deans Lyst, Dedren Snead, Deedee Magno Hall, dj-jo, Donny Cates, Estelle, Fabrice Sapolsky, Jules Conroy (FamilyJules), Dustin Fletcher (Flashfletch Cosplay), Gabi, Gaku Space, Gigguk, Go Big or Go Home Cosplay, Grant, Greg Burnham, Hiroaki Yura, Hoyt Silva, Jarman Props, Jim Mahfood, Jonah Levy, Jonny Cruz, JT Music, Justin Briner, Kamikaze, Keith Silverstein, Kenji Kamiyama, Kenny James, Kyle Starks, Laura Martin, Lee "Fev" Camara-Smith, Luci Christian, Maki Terashima-Furuta, Marcus Williams, Matt Silva, Matt Wilson, Mckenzie Atwood, Megan Hutchinson, Michaela Dietz, Mikal Mosley, Mike Salcedo, Monica Rial, Mr. CreepyPasta, Myuu: Dark Piano, OR30, Overworld Designs, Patrick Warburton, Pixelbash Props, Sungwon Cho, rabbidluigi, Rebel Taxi, Reuben Langdon, Rico Renzi, Robert Wilson, Roger Clark, Samantha Kelly, Shingo2, Shinji Aramaki, Spatcave Studios, Steve Blum, Substantial, Suda 51, Supergiant Games, Susan Egan, Sydsnap, Talynn Kel, The NPC Collective, The Runaway Guys, Jerod Collins (The8BitDrummer), Thrill Builds, Tim Effler, Tony Anselmo, Tony Weaver, Tracy Yardley, Vivienne M. (Vivziepop), Volpin Props, Zach Callison
May 21–24, 2020	Georgia World Congress Center; Atlanta, Georgia	Cancelled	Chalk Twins, Greg Cipes, Justin Cook, Mr. Creepy Pasta, Hayden Daviau, Bill Farmer, Catherine Jones, Phil LaMarr, Brendan LaSalle, Jason Marsden, Charles Martinet, Scott Menville, Nerds Know, Khary Payton, Alejandro Saab, Christopher Sabat, Fred Tatasciore, The Triforce Quartet, Hynden Walch, Christopher Wehkamp
May 27–30, 2021	Georgia World Congress Center; Atlanta, Georgia	Cancelled	
December 18–19, 2021 (Winterfest)	Georgia World Congress Center; Atlanta, Georgia		Steve Blum, Caleb Hyles, Zeno Robinson, Billy West, PopCultHQ
May 26–29, 2022	Georgia World Congress Center; Atlanta, Georgia	42,595	Zach Aguilar, Richie Branson, Chalk Twins (cancelled), SungWon Cho, Greg Cipes, Colleen Clinkenbeard, Justin Cook, Claire Margaret Corlett, Mr. Creepy Pasta, Hayden Daviau, Steve Downes, Bill Farmer, Kellen Goff, Carl Gustav Horn, Caleb Hyles, Bret Iwan, Catherine Jones, Harrison Krix, Phil LaMarr, Brendan LaSalle, Jason Marsden, Charles Martinet, David Matranga, Mega Ran, Lindze Merritt, Michaela Jill Murphy, Nerds Know, Emily Neves, OR3O, Khary Payton, Casey Renee, Alejandro Saab, Jonah Scott, Substantial, Fred Tatasciore, Jen Taylor, The Triforce Quartet, Christopher Wehkamp, Steve Whitmire
May 25–28, 2023	Georgia World Congress Center; Atlanta, Georgia	48,000+	Adassa, Johnny Yong Bosch, Don Bluth, Justin Briner, Griffin Burns, Ray Chase, Robbie Daymond, Grey DeLisle, Jack De Sena, Jessie Flower, Olivia Hack, Ironmouse, The Living Tombstone, Yuri Lowenthal, Adam McArthur, Brandon McInnis, Max Mittelman, Tara Platt, Sarah-Nicole Robles, Megan Shipman (cancelled), Kaiji Tang, J. Michael Tatum, Janey Varney, Anne Yatco, Zentreya
May 24–27, 2024	Georgia World Congress Center, Omni Hotel Atlanta; Atlanta, Georgia	55,800+	
May 22–25, 2025	Georgia World Congress Center; Atlanta, Georgia	59,222	
May 21–24, 2026	Georgia World Congress Center; Atlanta, Georgia	67,277	

== Peripheral events on tour ==
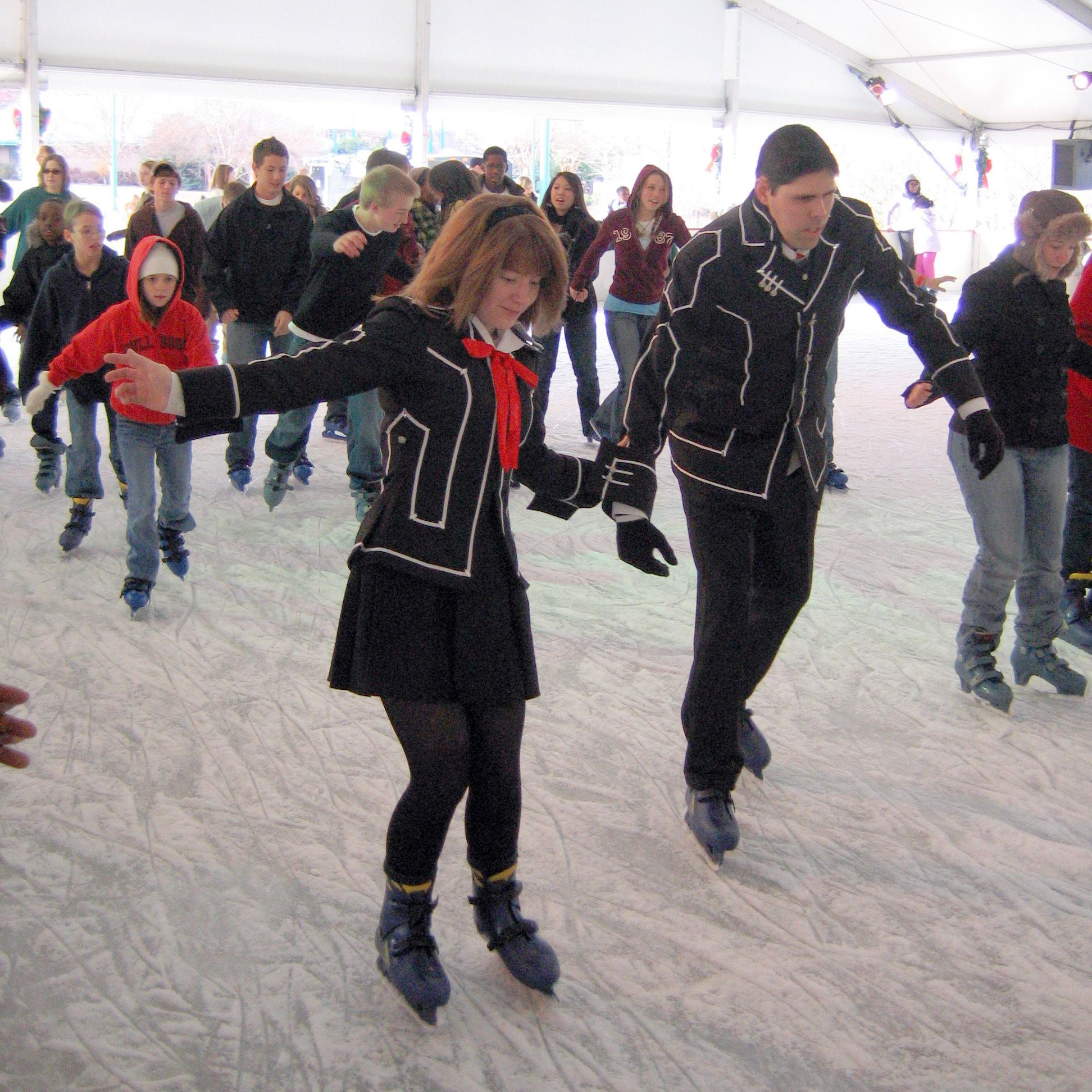
Cosplayers at MomoCon's Cosplayers on Ice 2008

MomoCon also sponsors local events that bolster awareness of the convention and Japanese culture. Anime O-Tekku began this tradition by bringing many movies and gatherings to Georgia Tech's campus and Atlanta, and MomoCon continues it.

- Georgia Tech Riki-Oh Night 2005 - MomoCon helped staff and financially sponsor the annual Georgia Tech cult film festival and Super Smash Bros. Melee tournament, Riki-Oh Night. The convention paid in part for the banner and prizes for the tournament.
- Photoshoots on Tour 2006–2017 - MomoCon on Tour has hosted photoshoots around the southeast since 2006, including two Savannah shoots (one on Tybee Island), three South Carolina shoots, a zombie-themed Halloween shoot in Perry, GA, joint photoshoots with Middle Tennessee Anime Convention and Anime Weekend Atlanta in Chattanooga, TN and Rhodes Hall in Atlanta, respectively.
- Gaming Festivals 2009–2010, 2012–2014 MomoCon hosted a Summer and Winter Gaming Festival at the Georgia Tech Student Center. Events included board, card, and RPG gaming, as well as retro video gaming.
- Cosplayers on Ice 2007–2016 - Annually in December, MomoCon on Tour welcomes attendees to the Cosplayers on Ice event.
- Steampunk Photoshoot 2008 - On May 24, 2008, MomoCon in association with Peach State Cosplay Society hosted a Steampunk photoshoot on Georgia Tech campus. The shoot took advantage of some of the unique campus architecture and was open to all types of costumers.
- MomoCon Winter Ball 2008–2015 - MomoCon hosts a winter semi-formal ball event annually. It features wintery decorations, DJs playing danceable anime/video game tunes as well as classic pop, rock, big band, lounge, and jazz music.
- MomoCon Summer Charity Ball 2008–2010, 2012–2014 - MomoCon hosts a summer semi-formal ball with all proceeds benefiting the Susan G. Komen organization for breast cancer awareness.
- Twilight Masquerade 2015, The Crystal Ball 2017 - MomoCon hosted (alongside Dragon Con for The Crystal Ball) a full formal masquerade event in 2015 and 2017 held in the Oceans Ballroom at the Georgia Aquarium.
- Winterfest was held from 18–19 December 2021, as a smaller-scale replacement for the main convention due to the COVID-19 pandemic.
