= Mutual combat =

Legal term in the United States

Mutual combat, a term commonly used in United States courts, occurs when two individuals intentionally and consensually engage in a fair fight, while not hurting bystanders or damaging property. There have been numerous cases where this concept was successfully used in defense of the accused. In some cases, mutual combat may result in killings.

== Notable examples ==
In 2012, MMA fighter Ben Fodor, in character as Phoenix Jones, engaged in a street fight in Seattle; police officers did not intervene or make arrests afterward. A video of the fight went viral. The Seattle Police Department later defended their officers for not intervening, with a police sergeant being paraphrased as stating "a rarely used city law allows fighting as long as both people agree to it, no bystanders are hurt, and no property is damaged." Seattle Municipal Code 12A.06.025 is the relevant statute.

Also in 2012, Gabriel Aubry and Olivier Martinez engaged in mutual combat and were not charged. In 2014, after Zac Efron had engaged in a fight in Skid Row, law enforcement officials did not make any arrests because they viewed it as mutual combat.

Mutual combat has been used to deny damage claims, as a legal defense, and to drop charges against fighting students.

== Oregon law ==
Oregon law specifically bans mutual combat, according to subsection three of ORS 161.215: "a person is not justified in using physical force upon another person if: the physical force involved is the product of a combat by agreement not specifically authorized by law."

== See also ==
- Duel
- Street fighting
- Trial by combat
