= Hideaki Kobayashi (cosplayer) =

Japanese cosplayer (born 1962)

- 小林 秀章
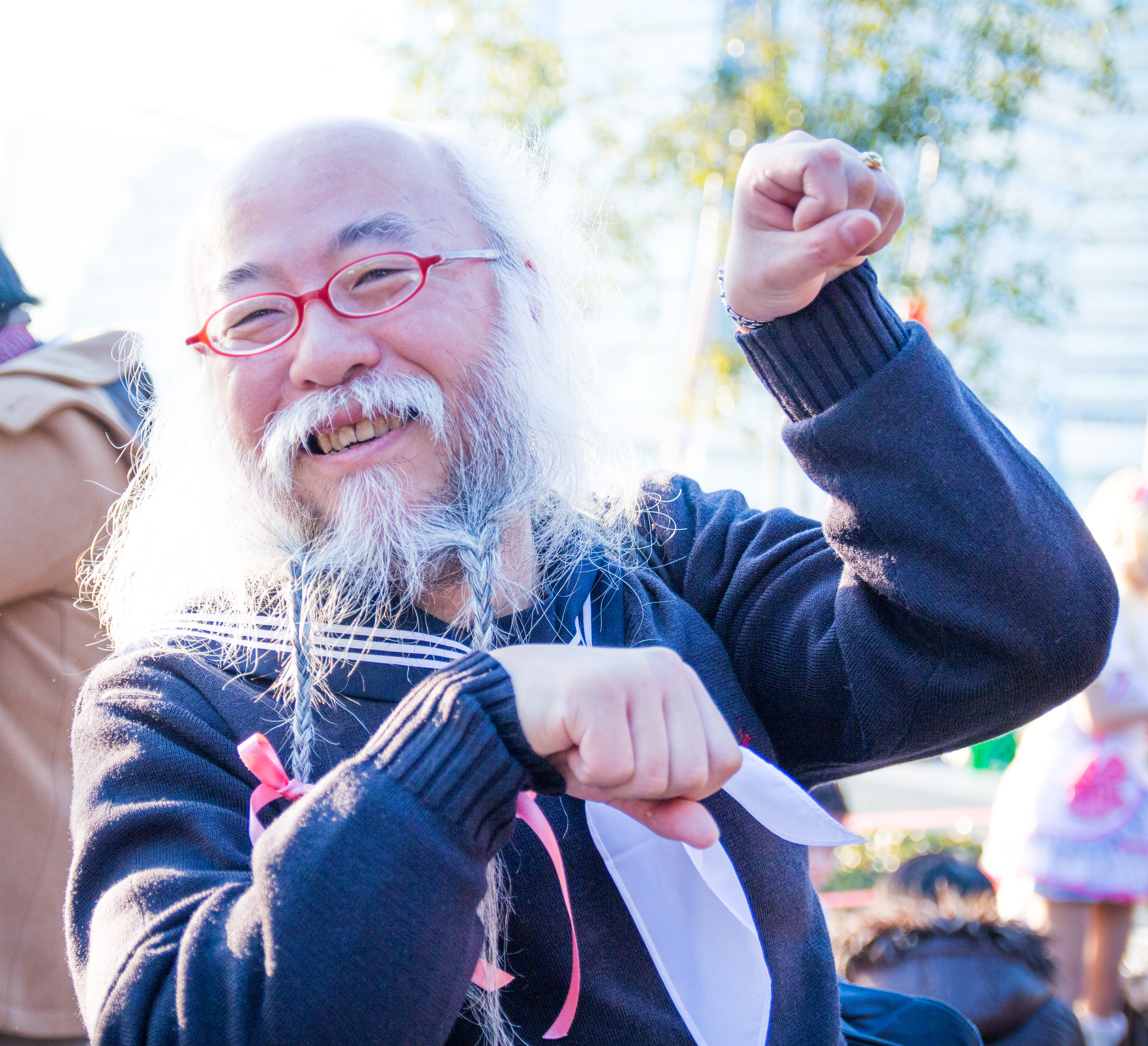
- Kobayashi in 2016
- Born: 1962 (age 63–64); Suginami Ward, Tokyo, Japan
- Other name: Sailor Suit Uncle
- Education: Waseda University
- Occupations: Cosplayer, computer engineer, music producer, photographer
- Known for: Cosplaying as school girls

Hideaki Kobayashi (小林 秀章, Kobayashi Hideaki) is a Japanese cosplayer, computer engineer, music producer, and photographer. He is known for cosplaying as a schoolgirl. He is nicknamed as Sailor Suit Uncle (セーラー服おじさん, Sērā-fuku Ojisan).

== Biography ==
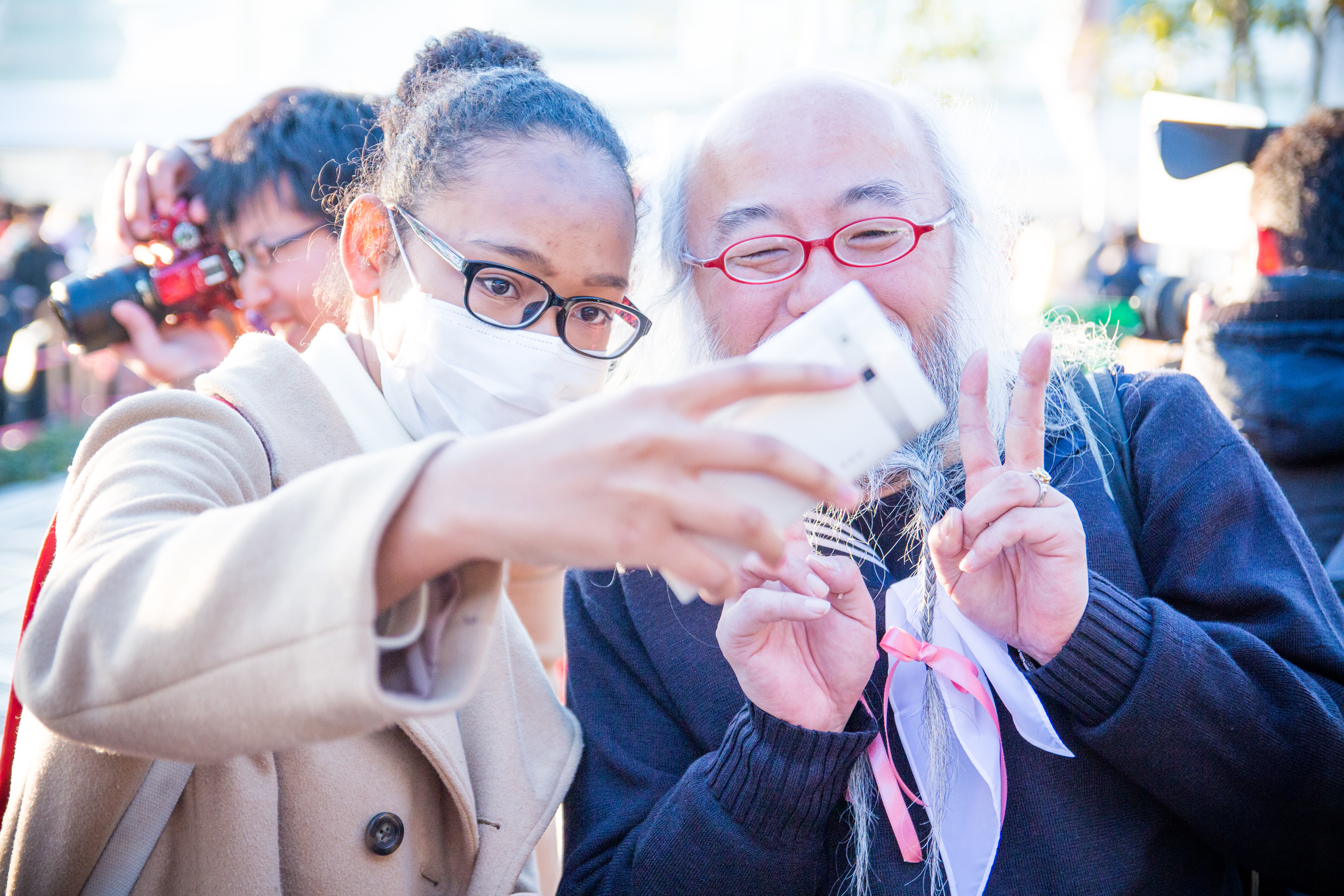
Kobayashi taking a photo with a fan

He was born in 1962 in Suginami Ward, Tokyo. He said in an interview with ITmedia that his "hobby" of cosplaying dates back to when he was in first and second grade, when he lifted his female classmate's skirt, for which he was forced to wear a sailor suit in front of his classmate as punishment. He attended Toho Middle School and High School, an all-boys school. He majored in Mathematics at the Faculty of Science and Engineering at Waseda University, where he also finished his master's study. He said that this was the time when he enjoyed cross-dressing in his room and secretly wearing panties. He works as an information processing software engineer at a printing company. He said that he started cosplaying after being at a cosplaying convention in May 2010.

In June 2011, he was invited by his friend to visit a ramen shop in Yokohama that gave away free ramen if a customer over 30 dressed up like a school girl. He started cosplaying after he found that people did not have a negative reception for his cosplay. Following that, he started walking around the streets of Shibuya every weekend.

=== Internet virality ===
He went viral on Twitter and the Japanese internet in 2013 after he was seen cosplaying in a Japanese school girls' uniform (sailor suit).

A sticker featuring him was created by the messaging app, Line. He was invited 10 times to various events in China and countries like Spain, Cuba, France and Thailand. A portrait of him was displayed in a subway station in Bangkok, Thailand.

=== Other ventures ===
Kobayashi also works as a computer engineer with a patent, and photographer and music producer for Chaos de Japon.

== Reception ==
Many tourists visiting Akihabara in Tokyo have praised Kobayashi. CNN praised Kobayashi calling him "courageous" for dressing up. Zenbei, a character from the video game Nippon Marathon, was inspired by him.

== Personal life ==
Kobayashi identifies as heterosexual. He is fluent in English.

== See also ==
- List of cosplayers
- Crossplay (cosplay)
- Femboy
