= Keekihime =

Austrian streamer and singer

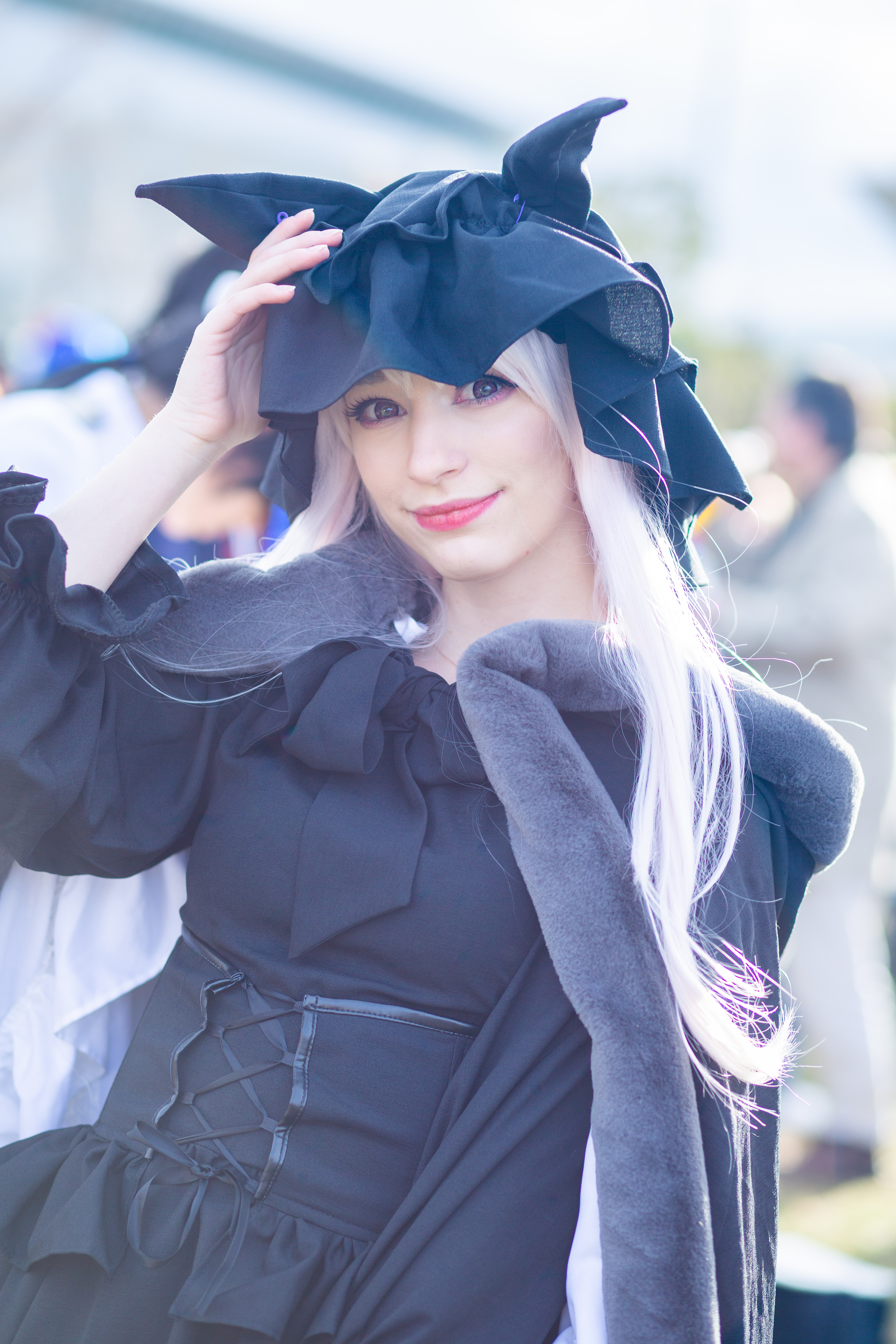
- Keekihime cosplaying as Erebus from Azur Lane in Comiket 95, 2018
- Born: 20 July 1995 (age 31); Austria
- Other name: Keekihime Yuumi
- Occupations: Online streamer; YouTuber; singer; cosplayer

YouTube information
- Channel: Keekihime
- Years active: 2010–present
- Genres: Dance cover; vlog
- Subscribers: 238 thousand
- Views: 9.57 million
- Musical career
- Genres: J-pop
- Label: FlyingStar Records
- Formerly of: Tone Jewel
- Last updated: April 14, 2026

Keekihime (ケーキ姫, Kēkihime; born 20 July 1995), formerly known as Keekihime Yuumi (ケーキ姫☆優海, Kēkihime Yūmi), is an Austrian online streamer, YouTuber, singer, and cosplayer. In 2010, Keekihime began posting dance covers and live streaming on the Japanese video website Niconico (known as Nico Nico Douga at the time), becoming one of the only non-Japanese live streamers on the website at the time. She was also a member of the Japanese girl group Tone Jewel from 2012 to 2013.

== Early life ==
Keekihime became interested in Japanese culture after playing the video game Tales of Symphonia, which she received as a Christmas gift. At the time, she was also a fan of Japanese anime and manga, with her first manga series being Minami-ke, as well as Japanese idol singers, particularly Hello! Project. Keekihime also became interested in Nico Nico Douga after watching dance cover videos on the website. Besides her native German, Keekihime is also fluent in English and Japanese. Keekihime also attended a language school to study Latin.

== Career ==
When Keekihime was 14 years old, she posted her first video on Nico Nico Douga on 1 January 2010. Her username, meaning "cake princess" in Japanese, originated from her love of cakes and her wish to become a princess. She later posted dance covers on the website, as well as live streaming almost daily in Japanese. She stated that had an audience of approximately 1,000 to 3,000 people per live stream and was, at the time, the only non-Japanese live streamer on Nico Nico Douga. Keekihime stated that she was able to become fluent in Japanese in one year from live streaming daily. She was also nicknamed "Asuka" by her viewers due to her resemblance to Asuka Langley Soryu from Neon Genesis Evangelion.

At age 15, Keekihime applied to become a singer through an online audition held by Victor Entertainment and spent 3 months in Japan training. She was later offered to debut with two other girls as the girl group Tone Jewel, which was promoted as a trio of "hardcore otaku" high school girls. Before the group's official debut on 22 August 2012, they released an independent pre-debut extended play, titled Sistars Trip, at Comiket 82 on August 11, 2012, with the cover artwork drawn by Keekihime. Keekihime remained a member until the end of 2013, when she left due to issues with her visa, which limited the amount of times she was allowed to perform. Keekihime stated to Arama! Japan in 2014 that a Japanese anti-fan had convinced her management to end her contract and that she was unable to find other work in entertainment.

After returning to Austria, Keekihime worked as a hotel receptionist. During this time, she continued live streaming on Showroom and releasing music independently through TuneCore as a net idol. Her debut solo album, Sweet Tooth, was released in 2018. In addition, she began cosplaying in events such as Tokyo Game Show 2017, Comiket 94, and Tokyo Game Show 2018.

In March 2020, Keekihime moved back to Japan on a one-year working holiday visa. She stated she was working as a translator for the Japanese data consulting firm Classmethod. She later became the official voice actress and cosplayer for the company's mascot, Mesoko. She was unable to find cosplay work due to the COVID-19 pandemic and returned to Austria after her visa ended.

== Personal life ==
While attending Comiket 104 as a cosplayer in August 2024, a Japanese man Keekihime described as a "stalker for over 5 years" forcefully held her in an embrace for an extended period. The perpetrator managed to slip away from convention staff, and the Japanese police advised her to contact the Austrian embassy.

== Discography ==
=== Studio albums ===
- Sweet Tooth (2018)

=== Singles ===
- "Shunkan Everyday" (瞬間エブリデイ) (2019)
- "Finding You" (2019)
- "My World" (2024)
