= Folkenstal =

Swiss cosplay artist

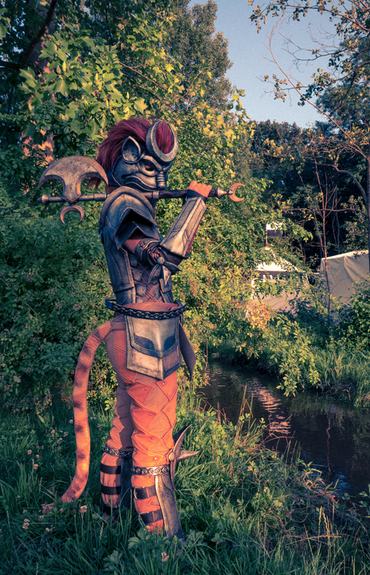
- Folkenstal
- Born: Switzerland
- Occupations: Cosplayer, prop maker and costume designer
- Years active: 2012–present
- Website: www.folkenstal.com

Folkenstal is a cosplay artist from Switzerland who specializes in weaponry, armor, and other props featured in popular MMORPG video games including The Elder Scrolls V: Skyrim, The Elder Scrolls Online and The Legend of Zelda franchises.

== Best known works ==
- The Elder Scroll from the video game The Elder Scrolls Online
- Banded Iron Armor from the video game The Elder Scrolls V: Skyrim
- Khajiit Helmet from the video game The Elder Scrolls Online
- Nordic ancient helmet from the video game The Elder Scrolls V: Skyrim
- Cosplay Award Trophies for the Swiss convention Fantasy Basel
