= Crossplay (cosplay) =

Type of cosplay

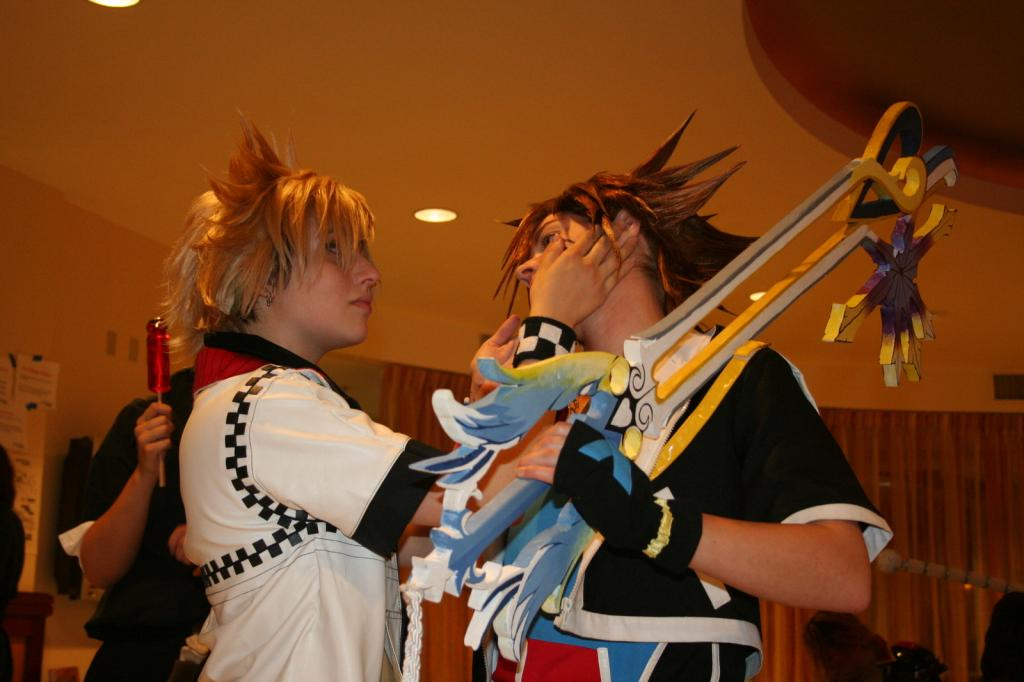
Two female crossplayers dressed as Sora and Roxas from the Kingdom Hearts series strike a yaoi pose.

Crossplay (a portmanteau of "cross-dressing" and "cosplay") is a type of cosplay in which the person dresses up as a character of a different gender. Crossplay's origins lie in the anime convention circuit, though, like cosplay, it has not remained exclusive to the genre. While it is similar to Rule 63 (gender-bending) cosplay, it can be differentiated by the performer becoming completely immersed in the codes of another gender, rather than picking and choosing what behavior enhances the performance.

In most countries that play host to hobbyists who would call themselves cosplayers, female-to-male crossplayers (females costumed as male characters, sometimes abbreviated "FtM") are far more common, due to a variety of social and cultural factors. As bishōnen are portrayed in manga and anime as liminal beings, it is considered "easier" for women to cross-play as bishōnen than it would be for them to crossplay as a male character from a Western series.

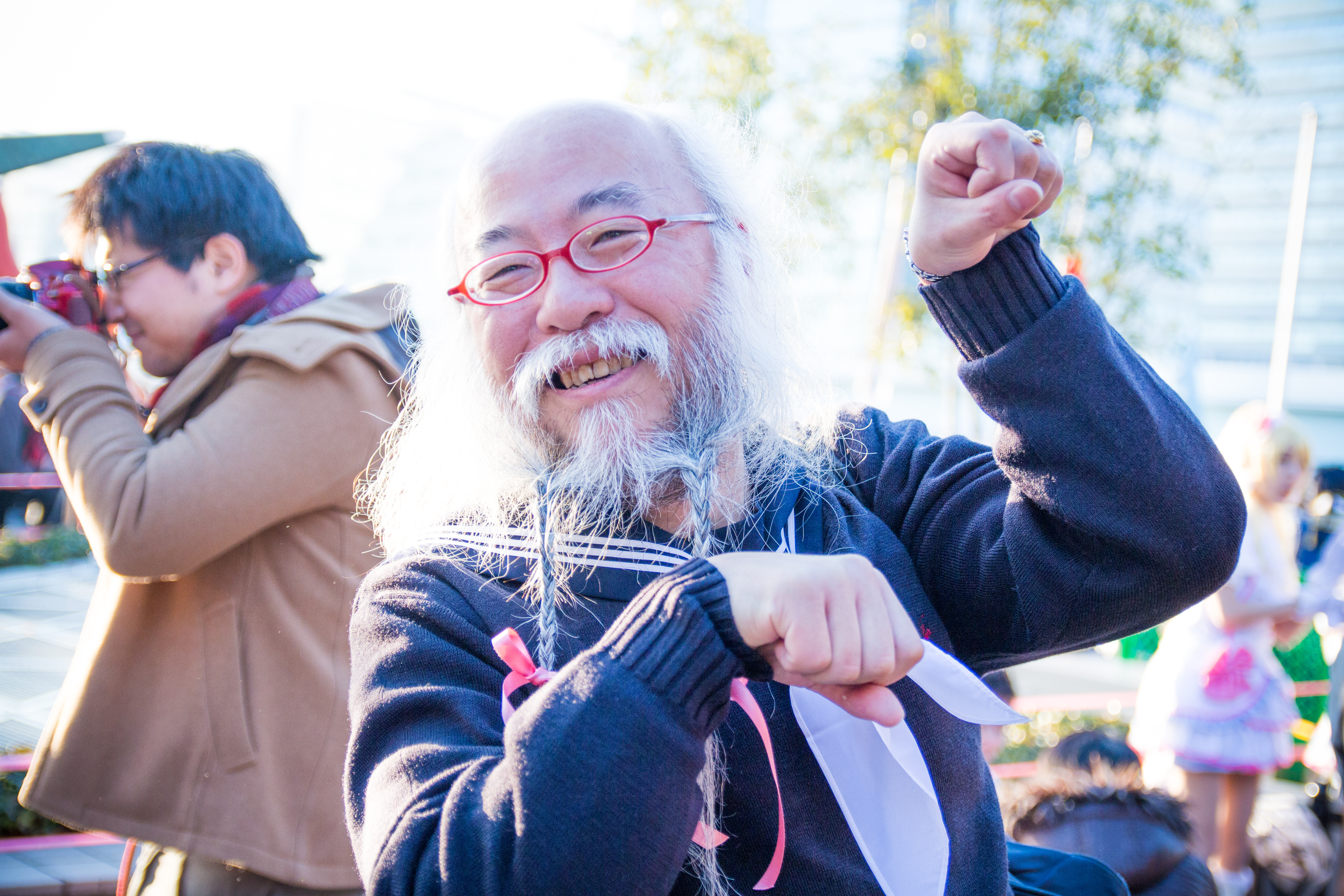
Hideaki Kobayashi, a male crossplayer at Comiket 91

Male-to-female crossplayers (males costumed as female characters) are somewhat more common outside Japan. Originally, in the United States, a popular anime series for MtF crossplayers was Sailor Moon, creating "humorous effect and social levity".

Gender bending crossplay

Crossplay has seen some controversy from anti-LGBTQ activists and has been compared by critics to drag. In 2023, following the passing of an anti-drag law in Florida, crossplay was banned from that year's TFcon. Refunds were made available for individuals who felt unsafe attending.

== See also ==
- Cross-dressing
- Gender bender
