= Katie George (cosplayer) =

American cosplayer

- Born: September 7, 1988 (age 37); Fairhope, Alabama, United States
- Website: Official website

Katie George (born on September 7, 1988 in Fairhope, Alabama, United States) is an American cosplayer who has been cosplaying since 2004 and lives in Atlanta. George has been a special guest at conventions in the United States and abroad, including MomoCon, Pensacon and more, hosting panels and acting as a judge in costume contests. In 2012, she was featured in the television documentary Cosplay: Crafting a Secret Identity and represented the US at the World Cosplay Summit in Nagoya, Japan. In 2014, she joined the cast of the reality television show Heroes of Cosplay.

== See also ==
- List of cosplayers
