= Master Legend =

Master Legend is a "real-life superhero" and social activist from Winter Park, Florida (near Orlando, Florida) in the United States and a local celebrity in Orlando. Master Legend gained national attention in the 1068/1069 issue of Rolling Stone Magazine. The magazine featured a nine-page article about the superhero subculture in the U.S. and focused on Master Legend and his sidekick, Ace. He graduated from John Ehret High School in Marrero, Louisiana in the class of 1982 and is featured in the 2008 documentary film "Your Friendly Neighborhood Hero". In 2017, actor John Hawkes (actor) portrayed Master Legend in dark comedy television pilot.

In April 2009, he was featured in an interview with BBC Radio 1 DJ Greg James. On May 30, 2009, Master Legend was interviewed by Fifth Base, an internet radio show based in Orlando. He detailed his many adventures, which included his abuse by a child molester, overview and details of his armor, and disclosure regarding his nemeses. Master Legend received a certificate of commendation from the Orange County Sheriff's Department. He continues to fight crime with his police friends. With his great friends in the Justice Crusaders, he leads a crusade to help the forgotten veterans and homeless people and their children. A self-proclaimed trained fighting battle machine that will do all it takes to protect the innocent, he possesses a high-voltage tazer gun, a Justice Van, body protection and gifts for the homeless, which include food, water, clothing, and toys. In the summer of 2011, Master Legend was featured in HBO's Superheroes series. On September 16, 2011, the Orlando Sentinel ran an article on Master Legend and the Justice Crusades - Symbiote, Purple Lotus and Se7ven - detailing their adventures in downtown Orlando as they attempted to help the poor and homeless in the community.

Master Legend has claimed to be in more than 1,000 fist fights, shot twice and involved in numerous gang battles. He and his real-life superhero compatriots have also created the non-profit Team Justice Inc. to provide emergency help (clothing medical care, food, and so forth) to those in need, however the organization was deregistered in 2014 per Sunbiz.
