= Man in Tree =

2016 standoff in Seattle, Washington, US

Coordinates: 47.612167°N 122.338762°W

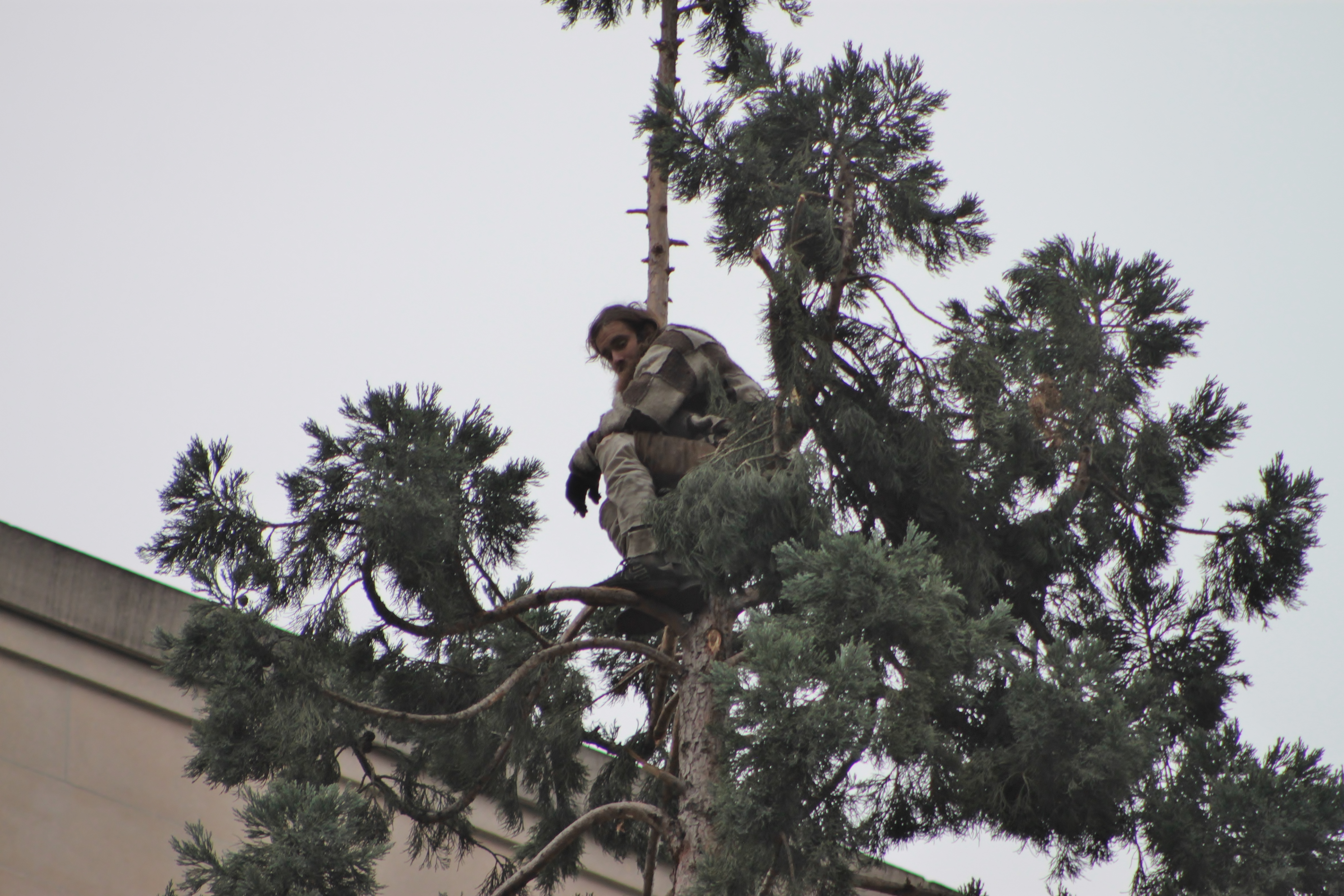
Man in Tree

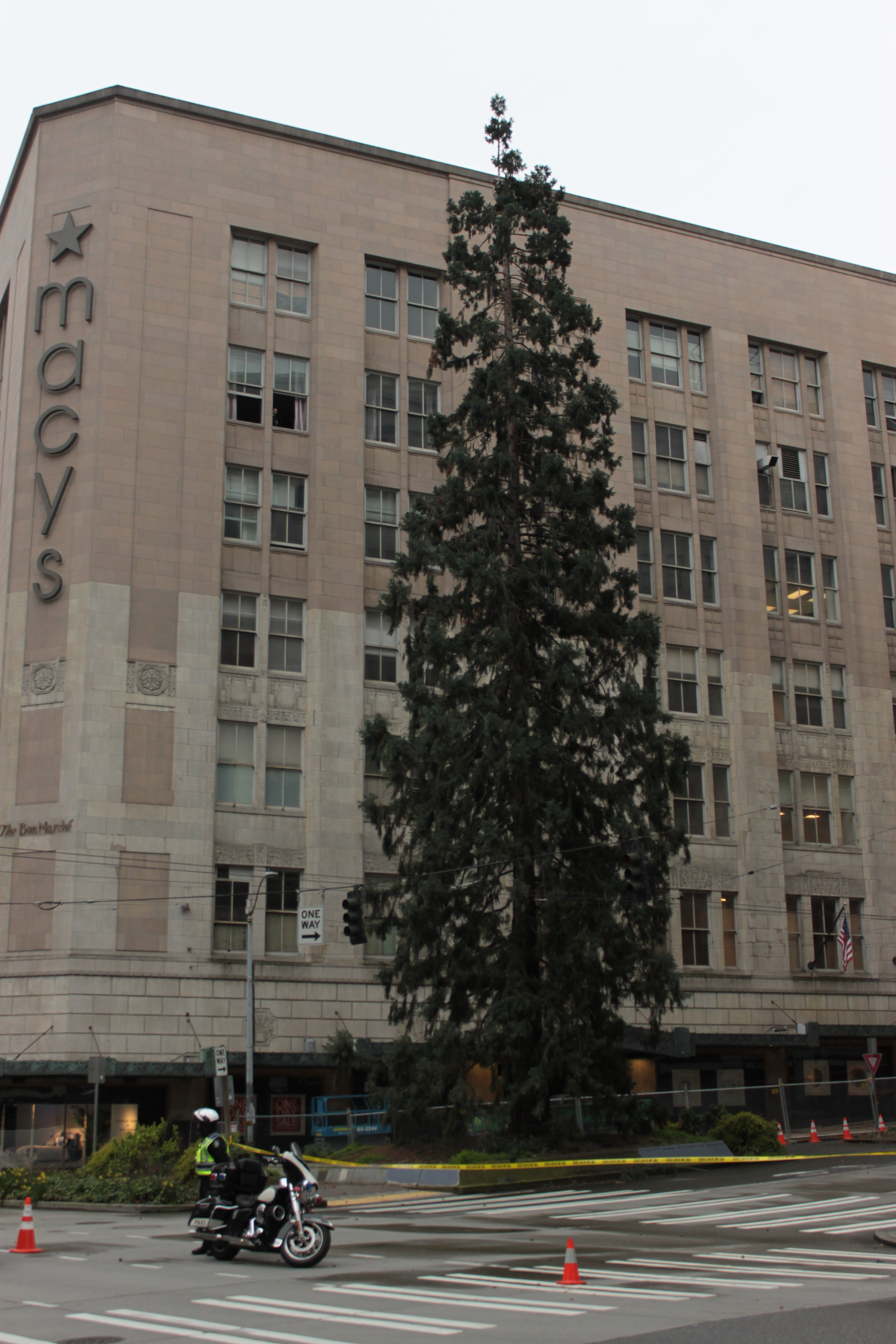
The sequoia tree in the Stewart Street traffic island on March 23, with surrounding streets closed off by police

Man in Tree refers to a widely viewed standoff between an American man named Cody Lee Miller and local law enforcement on March 22–23, 2016, in Seattle, Washington. Miller scaled a large sequoia tree near a major downtown intersection and remained there for over 24 hours, rebuffing rescue and negotiation attempts and tossing debris at onlookers. The situation disrupted Seattle traffic patterns, became a trending topic across social media, and attracted national attention from news outlets. Miller's treatment by police and coverage by the media has spurred further debate on the adequacy of mental health care in the USA.

== Details ==
Miller climbed an 80-foot (24 m) giant sequoia in a Stewart Street traffic island outside the historic former Bon Marché flagship store in downtown Seattle, early on March 22, 2016. He remained there for nearly 25 hours while police forces attempted to coax him down. Miller responded to dialog attempts by throwing sequoia cones, branches he had torn from the crown, and fruit remains, some of which hit passersby. The falling debris and the intervention efforts gridlocked roadways in downtown Seattle’s center, forcing multiple buses to find alternate routes. The event garnered significant media attention, prompting viral Twitter parodies, live streams of negotiation efforts, and national news coverage. After over 24 hours, Miller descended the tree of his own accord at around 11:45 AM on March 23, where he was given food and taken into an ambulance. Miller was subsequently charged with third-degree assault and first-degree malicious mischief but was found incompetent to stand trial after a psychiatric competency evaluation.

== Impact ==
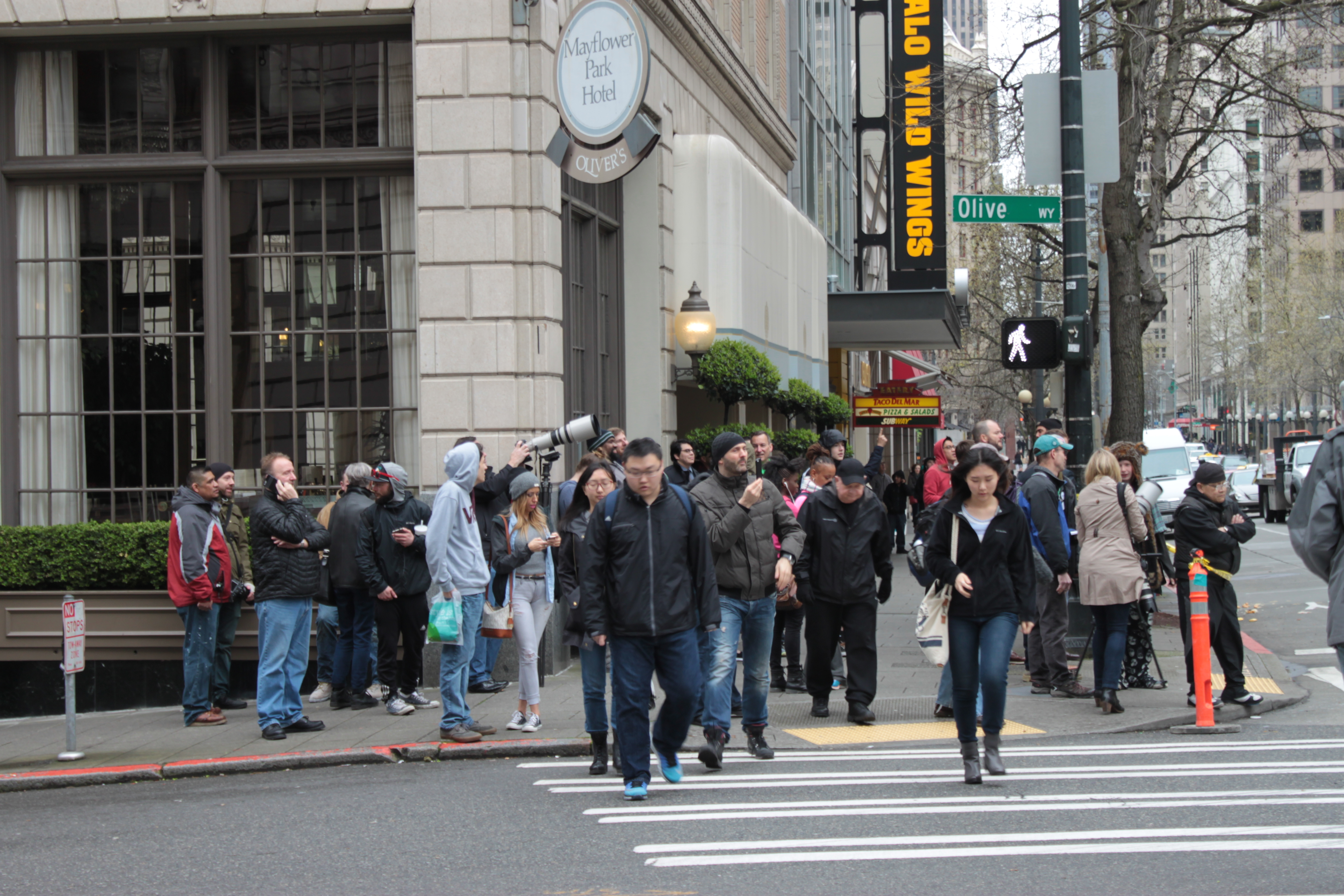
Onlookers on 4th Avenue watching the "Man in Tree"

Man in Tree generated nationwide interest, with news stations feeding live streams of the event and Twitter users elevating the hashtag "#ManInTree" to trending status.

The event also rekindled discussion of the country’s mental health system. After the incident, Miller’s mother said that he was "obviously sick" and that psychiatric care would be more appropriate than jail time. Online periodicals helped spread this perspective in hopes of reorienting the conversation around systemic reform. Additionally, Congressman Tim Murphy (R, PA) cited Man in Tree when calling for Congressional action on his proposed Helping Families in Mental Health Crisis Act (H.R. 2646).

Tree experts evaluated the sequoia afterward and found that the ordeal inflicted roughly $7,800 worth of damage to the tree.
