= Phoenix Jones =

American real-life superhero

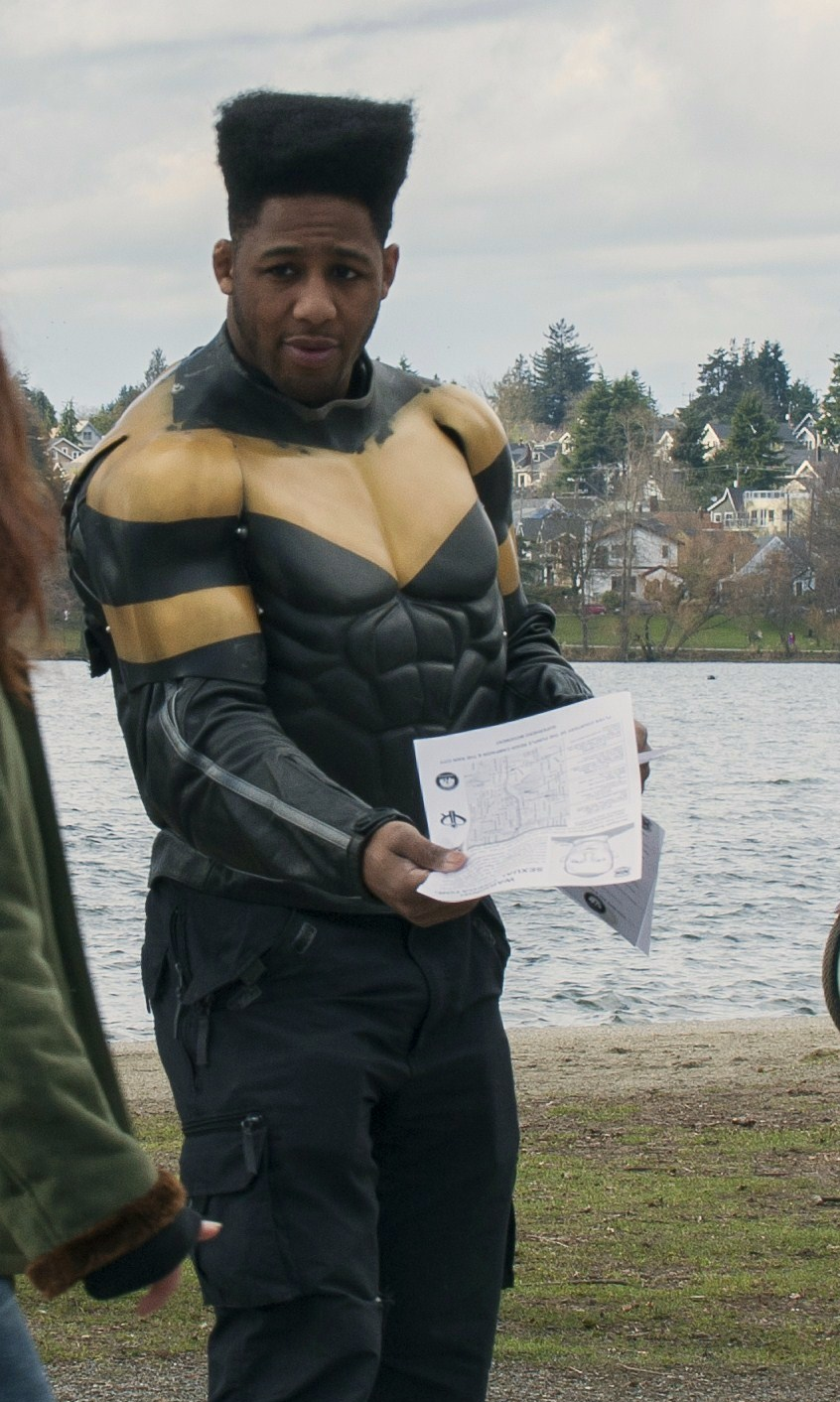
- Jones without his mask in 2013
- Born: Benjamin John Francis Fodor; May 25, 1988 (age 38); Texas, U.S.
- Occupations: Costumed vigilante; WSOF fighter; mixed martial artist
- Known for: Confronting alleged lawbreakers while dressed in a superhero costume.
- Relatives: Caros Fodor (brother)

Phoenix Jones (born Benjamin John Francis Fodor, May 25, 1988) is an American real-life superhero and mixed martial artist. Initially wearing a ski mask to intervene in a public assault, Fodor later developed a full costume and adopted "Phoenix Jones" as a pseudonym. From 2011 until its dissolution in 2014, Jones was the leader of the Rain City Superhero Movement, a Seattle, Washington-based citizen patrol group that described itself as a crime prevention brigade.

Jones says the best way to prevent getting mistaken for a criminal by the police is to wear a "supersuit", although local police have expressed concern that the strange costumes may lead to emergency calls from citizens who mistake the "superheroes" for criminals. Jones has said that all members of the Rain City Superhero Movement have a military or mixed martial arts background.

Jones is signed to World Series of Fighting, where he has fought at two catchweights, which included fighting his older foster brother, UFC, Strikeforce, and ONE Championship fighter Caros Fodor.

A feature-length documentary, Phoenix Jones: The Rise and Fall of a Real Life Superhero, premiered at the SXSW Film & TV Festival on March 13, 2026.

== Adoption of persona ==
Jones has said he wanted to take policing matters into his own hands after his car was broken into and his son was injured upon returning to the vehicle and falling on the broken glass. Jones said he was told several people saw the break-in happen, but did not intervene. Later, Jones says that he encountered a friend being seriously assaulted outside a bar, and after calling 911 he put on the mask from the earlier break-in and "made a commotion" until the police showed up. "And I thought, why didn't someone help him? There were seventy people outside that bar and no one did anything."

Jones went on to develop a full costume and pseudonym, when his crime-fighting behavior made him too recognizable. In a CBS news broadcast, Jones is shown entering a back room of an unnamed comic book store in which he changes into costume which consists of a Dragon Skin brand bulletproof vest and stab plating, as well as equipment including a stun baton, pepper spray or tear gas, handcuffs and a first aid kit.

Jones later became part of the Rain City Superhero Movement. In July 2011, local police recorded ten citizens patrolling the city in superhero costumes, using the names Thorn, Buster Doe, Green Reaper, The Mantis, Gemini, No Name, Catastrophe, Thunder 88, Penelope and Phoenix Jones. An individual using the pseudonym "Red Dragon" has also claimed to be a member of the group.

== Press coverage ==
- On Sunday, January 2, 2011, in Lynnwood, Phoenix Jones stopped and chased away a car thief as the car owner (who asked to be identified only as "Dan") stood by in shock as Jones ran into action. CBS News introduced Dan and Phoenix Jones to one another the following Monday evening. Dan proceeded to thank Jones numerous times while later talking about Phoenix's gear.
- A few days later, ABC News aired a news story covering Jones. In this report, footage shows Phoenix Jones preventing an intoxicated man from entering his car. Jones threatens to use a stun baton as the angry and inebriated man approaches Jones with the intent to fight. In the video, a police officer is shown later talking to Phoenix Jones and his group regarding the effect masks may have on an intoxicated individual.
- On Saturday, September 24, 2011, in the Belltown neighborhood of Seattle, Phoenix Jones doused a man with pepper spray after he attempted to steal a bus. The driver of the bus had been handing out fliers when another individual attempted to steal the bus. Jones was reported to have intervened and the hijacker escaped with his skin dyed orange due to the spray. Jones says he didn't receive any help from Seattle police, who took hours to respond to the incident.
- On Sunday, October 9, 2011, in Seattle, Jones was arrested for his role in an altercation involving pepper spray. Close associates, who were present and equipped with a video camera, told reporters that Phoenix Jones broke up an unfair fight between two groups of nightclub patrons. According to police reports, the officers who responded determined that "there was no fight", with one member of the group denying that anyone among them had been fighting. They asked that the masked man be "arrested for attacking them." According to one woman who was involved in the altercation, after an argument had broken out between her group and another, Jones suddenly approached and pepper sprayed them, saying "I'm a superhero". The next day, videographer Ryan McNamee uploaded a video online showing Jones responding to what McNamee described as a "huge fight". McNamee's video shows the woman hitting Phoenix Jones and another person with her shoe. Jones was released on bail hours later with no charges having been filed.
- In another incident several hours earlier, Phoenix Jones had come to the defense of a potential fight victim. Police arrived after the aggressors had fled. In their report, the police called it a case of "questionable use of pepper spray", but the victim later told the Seattle Times that Jones was indeed a hero who had saved him from "a potential beat-down".
- On Sunday, November 27, 2011, near the Belltown neighborhood of Seattle, Phoenix Jones and crew followed a man accused of stabbing another man. They prevented the attacker from fleeing until the Seattle police arrived.
- On Friday, January 6, 2012, Phoenix Jones and crew stopped a fight at the same location of the New Year's Eve shooting in Belltown.
- On Tuesday, May 1, 2012, a blogger reported that Phoenix Jones had pepper sprayed black bloc protesters in downtown Seattle, although Jones denied this on Twitter. In an interview on the Bob Rivers Show on May 2, Phoenix Jones asserted that, while undercover with the protesters, several of them revealed to him a plot to bomb the city courthouse. According to Phoenix Jones, after telling the police and receiving no support, he and another member of the Rain City Superhero Movement intercepted the protesters at the courthouse and acted in self-defense as the protesters began throwing rocks and bottles through the windows and glass doors of the court house. Fellow costumed activists El Caballero and Midnightjack accompanied Phoenix Jones.
- In November 2012, Jones hit the headlines for engaging in mutual combat.
- On Friday, March 27, 2015 in New Haven, Connecticut, just before Phoenix Jones was to be the featured speaker at The Institute Library's Amateur Hour speaking series, he prevented a man from being stabbed by holding off a group of men until police arrived. Deputized to hold the superhero's backpack was Amateur Hour host and This American Life contributor Jack Hitt, to whom Phoenix Jones later jokingly gave the superhero moniker "Blue Corduroy".
- On Sunday, September 20, 2015 in Seattle, Washington, Jones spotted three men pistol-whipping another man, and after alerting police, charged the man holding the gun and knocked it out of his hand. The three were arrested for assault, with one being charged with possession of a firearm by a felon.
- On Tuesday, March 22, 2016 in Seattle, Washington, Jones attempted to assist authorities in talking the "man in tree" down from the 80-foot sequoia he had climbed, but police rejected the offer.
- Jones was seen patrolling the Capitol Hill Autonomous Zone in June 2020.

When asked if he would have someone arrested for smoking cannabis, Jones said he considered it a low priority, and that he has no problem with people using drugs, but wants drug dealers to "sell somewhere else."

== Injury ==
Jones reports being stabbed with a knife while trying to intervene with a drug dealer and a resident, damaging part of his costume which had to be repaired. He has told police that his ballistic vest helped stop a bullet during an incident in Tacoma.

In 2011, Jones claims to have had his nose broken by an assailant while attempting to break up a fight, when one of the men pulled a gun on him while another one kicked him, breaking his nose. This incident was never reported to police, and was treated by Jones' private doctor.

== Arrest record ==
Seattle City Attorney Pete Holmes has called Jones a "deeply misguided individual."

In October 2011, Jones was arrested for investigation of assault, after using pepper spray to break up an alleged fight. He spent approximately seven hours in jail before posting the $3,800 bail. No charges were filed and the case was dropped later that month.

On January 9, 2020, Jones was arrested for allegedly selling Methylenedioxymethamphetamine (MDMA) to an undercover police officer. At the time of his arrest, police alleged that he and his accomplice were also in possession of about 4 grams of cocaine. As of 2022, he was on felony probation.

== Mixed martial arts ==
Ben Fodor
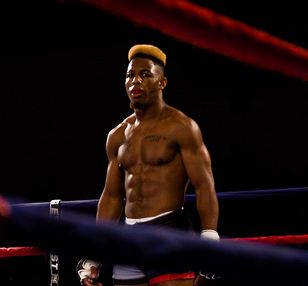
- Fodor at an MMA event, fighting as "Fear the Flattop"
- Born: May 25, 1988 (age 38)
- Other names: Flattop, Vigilante
- Nationality: American
- Height: 6 ft 0 in (183 cm)
- Weight: 170 lb (77 kg; 12 st 2 lb)
- Division: Welterweight
- Reach: 71 in (180 cm)
- Fighting out of: Seattle, Washington, United States
- Team: AMC Kickboxing
- Years active: 2006–present (MMA)

Mixed martial arts record
- Total: 11
- Wins: 7
- By knockout: 1
- By submission: 4
- By decision: 2
- Losses: 3
- By decision: 3
- Draws: 1

Other information
- Mixed martial arts record from Sherdog

=== Amateur career ===
Ben Fodor began his amateur MMA career in December 2006. Over the next four years, he amassed a record of 15 wins and 2 losses as an amateur.

=== Professional career ===
Fodor made his professional MMA debut in November 2013 for the Cage Warrior Combat promotion based in his native Washington state. Fodor is the younger foster brother of Strikeforce and UFC veteran Caros Fodor.

On March 11, 2015, it was announced that Fodor had signed an exclusive contract with World Series of Fighting. Fodor made his debut at WSOF 20 on April 10, 2015, wanting to be known under his pseudonym "Phoenix Jones". He faced Emmanuel Walo and lost the fight via unanimous decision, his first loss in his professional career, leaving with a record of 5 wins, 1 draw, and 1 loss. On September 18, 2015, he rebounded with a rare headscissors submission win over Roberto Yong at World Series of Fighting 23: Gaethje vs. Palomino II.

=== Mixed martial arts record ===
Professional record breakdown
11 matches	7 wins	3 losses
By knockout	1	0
By submission	4	0
By decision	2	3
Draws	1	

Res.	Record	Opponent	Method	Event	Date	Round	Time	Location	Notes
Loss	7–3–1	Austin Vanderford	Decision (unanimous)	CageSport 47	October 14, 2017	5	5:00	Tacoma, Washington, United States	
Win	7–2–1	Albert Tadevosyan	Submission (kimura)	Rumble on the Ridge 36	October 1, 2016	3	2:56	Snoqualmie, Washington, United States	
Loss	6–2–1	Caros Fodor	Decision (unanimous)	WSOF 32	July 30, 2016	3	5:00	Everett, Washington, United States	
Win	6–1–1	Roberto Yong	Submission (scissor choke)	WSOF 23	September 18, 2015	1	3:09	Phoenix, Arizona, United States	Catchweight bout (160lbs)
Loss	5–1–1	Emmanuel Walo	Decision (unanimous)	WSOF 20	April 10, 2015	3	5:00	Mashantucket, Connecticut, United States	Catchweight bout (175lbs)
Win	5–0–1	Jason Novelli	Technical Submission (rear-naked choke)	Super Fight League 37	February 21, 2015	3	3:06	Tacoma, Washington, United States	
Draw	4–0–1	Tyson Cunningham	Draw (majority)	Super Fight League 36	December 13, 2014	5	5:00	Tacoma, Washington, United States	
Win	4–0	Justin Larsson	Decision (split)	Combat Games MMA: Battle at the Bay 8	July 26, 2014	3	5:00	Anacortes, Washington, United States	
Win	3–0	Justin Larsson	Submission (guillotine choke)	Combat Games MMA: Battle at the Bay 7	April 19, 2014	3	0:28	Anacortes, Washington, United States	
Win	2–0	Nick Coughran	TKO (punches)	Combat Games MMA: Super Brawl 1	April 6, 2014	2	4:45	Snoqualmie, Washington, United States	
Win	1–0	Zach Conn	Decision (unanimous)	Cage Warrior Combat 9	November 2, 2013	3	5:00	Kent, Washington, United States	
