= ASTA: The War of Tears and Winds =

2016 video game

- Developer: Polygon Games
- Publishers: NHN Corporation; Webzen
- Engine: CryEngine 3
- Platform: Microsoft Windows
- Release: 2 March 2016
- Genre: MMORPG

ASTA: The War of Tears and Winds (Korean: 아스타) was a massively multiplayer online role-playing game created by South Korean developer Polygon Games. The game was in development from 2010 through mid-October 2013.

The game featured two warring factions, large-scale player versus player and realm versus realm combat and has been touted as "the Asian World of Warcraft".

ASTA: The War of Tears and Winds was published in North America and Europe by Webzen Games, launched on 2 March 2016, and shut down its servers on 4 October the same year.

ASTA Online was re-released on Steam in July 2017 but then later shutdown again for unknown reasons. The game still appears on Steam but it cannot be downloaded.

== Setting ==
ASTA takes place in a high fantasy setting heavily inspired by East Asian myths, legends, and philosophy.

== Release ==
ASTA was shut down by NHN on 23 August 2015. NHN closed all of its other publishing online games at the end of the year.
