= Batman of San José =

Real-life superhero in California, U.S.

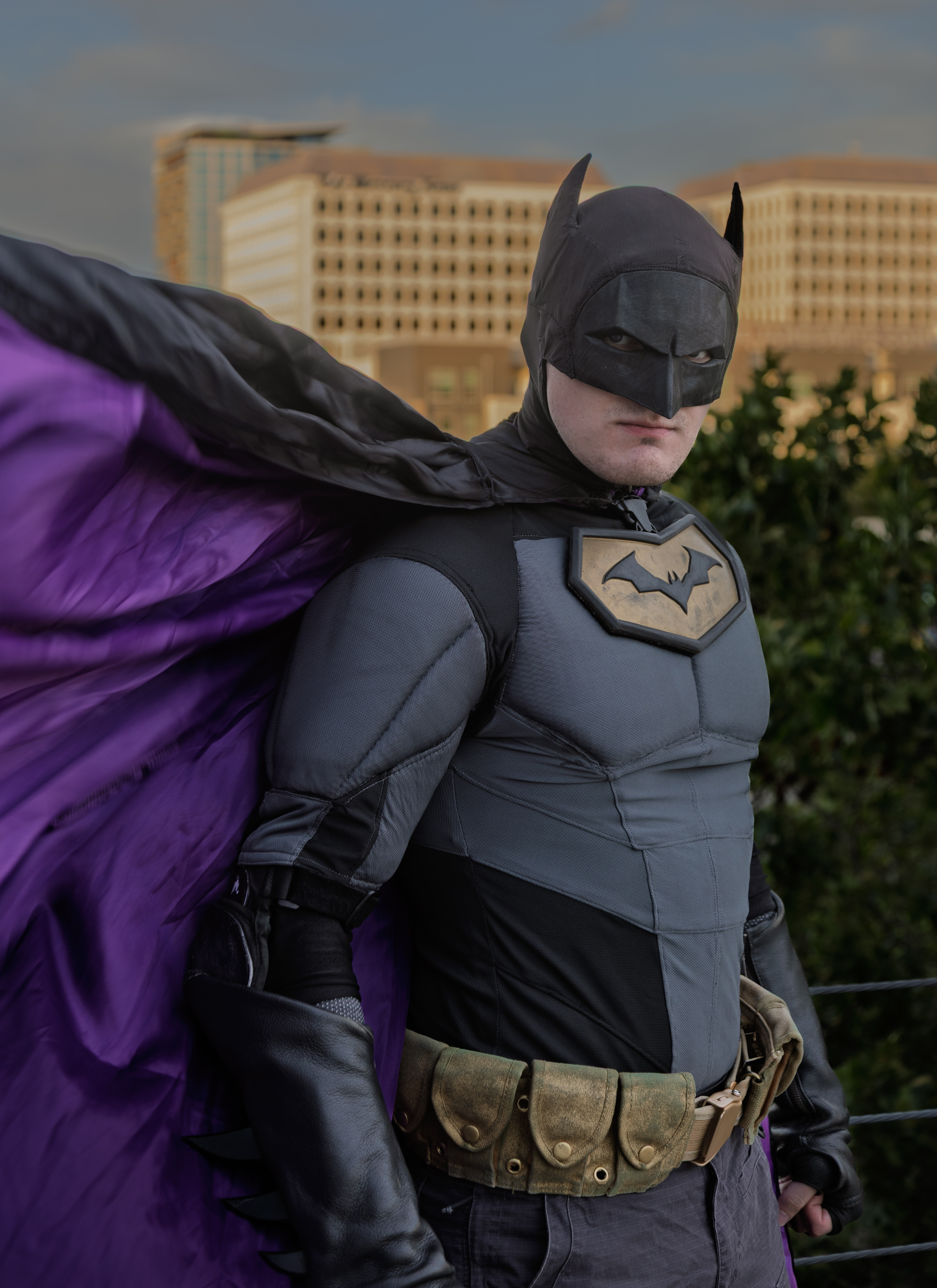
- Batman of San José from 2025
- Years active: 2017–present
- Height: 6 ft 3 in (191 cm)

Batman of San José is a real-life superhero who advocates for homeless people living in San Jose, California, dressing as Batman. He was inspired when he tried to help a woman whose car had broken down, only to find a mechanic was unwilling to help her because she was homeless. He rose to national prominence due to a video of him attending a Santa Clara, California city council meeting about immigration enforcement around Super Bowl LX.

== Origin ==
Batman started his work when he was in high school in San Jose. After seeing homeless people while walking to and from school, he decided to befriend them by offering supplies and human contact. The cost of the supplies was offset by donations he received.

He attended Rochester Institute of Technology as an industrial design major while also continuing his work in San Jose. It was at RIT he made his costume mask using a 3D printer.

== City Council Meeting ==
On January 27, 2026, he attended a joint meeting of the Santa Clara, California city council meeting and the Santa Clara Stadium Authority. The council was debating where and how city personnel would cooperate with the United States Immigration and Customs Enforcement operations surrounding the upcoming Super Bowl at Levi's Stadium. During the public comment period, Batman--dressed in costume--took the floor and addressed the members inaction and failure to act beforehand. He demanded the city formalize a policy to bar the use of city resources, data, or personnel to cooperate with ICE.

Video of the speech went viral and Batman did a Reddit AMA on February 12. During that session he said the council put in place a version of the policy he was advocating for.
