= Rain City Superhero Movement =

Costumed vigilante organization in Seattle, USA

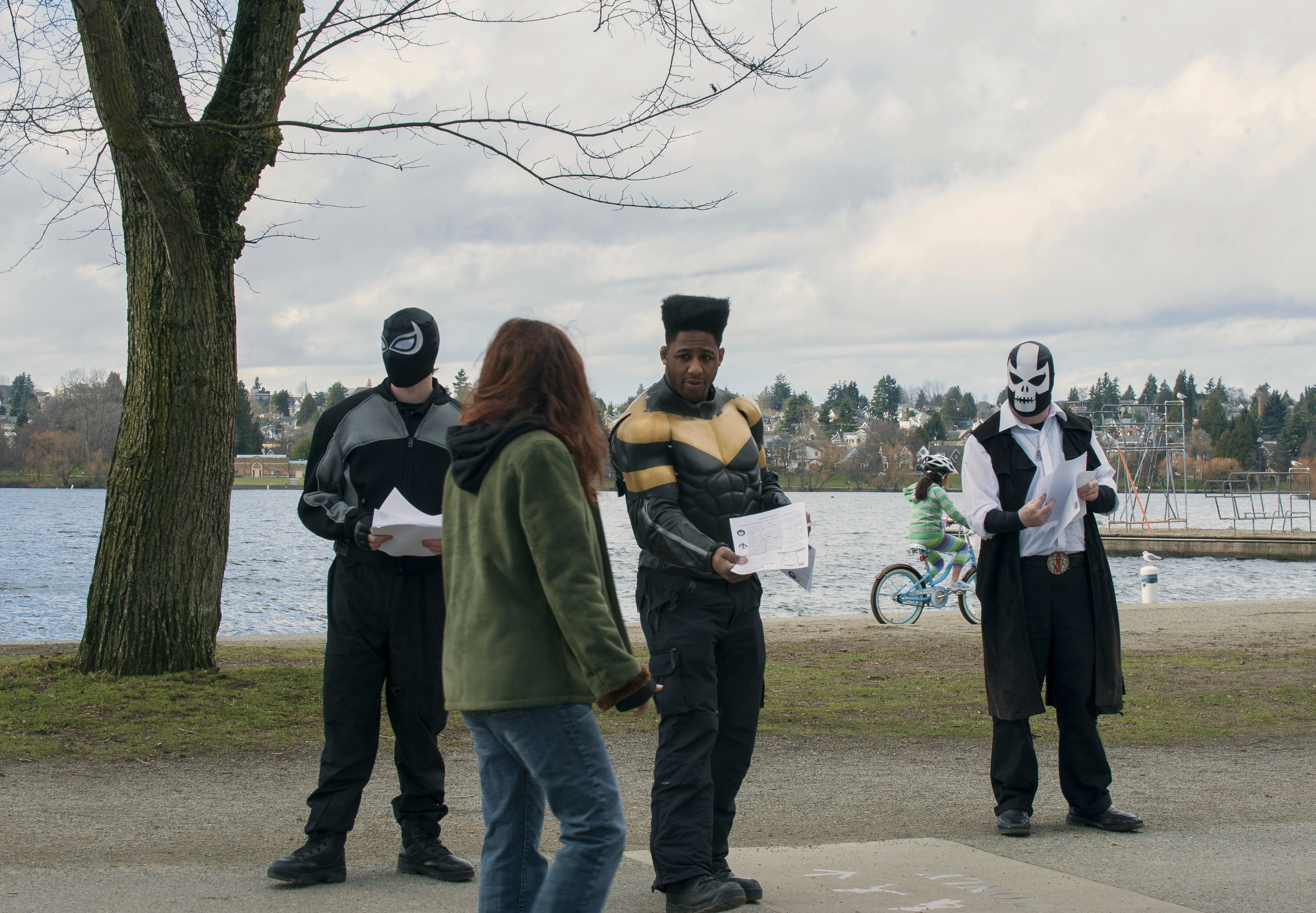
- Members of the Rain City Superhero Movement passing out flyers with descriptions of a criminal in 2013
- Formation: July 2011
- Dissolved: May 29, 2014
- Location: Seattle, Washington, United States
- Leader: Phoenix Jones (Benjamin Fodor)

The Rain City Superhero Movement was a Seattle-based organization active in the U.S. state of Washington between 2011 and 2014. It was composed of costumed activists who describe themselves as a crime-fighting brigade. Witnesses have reported that the group has intervened in crimes on several occasions, while the police maintained they would prefer that individuals other than sworn officers not place themselves in danger, and act as good witnesses instead.

In July 2011, local police recorded ten citizens patrolling the city of Seattle in superhero costumes, using the names Thorn, Buster Doe, Green Reaper, Stormbringer, The Mantis, Prodigy, Gemini, No Name, Catastrophe, Thunder 88, Penelope, and Phoenix Jones. Other members included "Red Dragon", Midnight Jack, Omega, Karma, SkyMan and El Caballero. "Purple Reign" worked mainly on intelligence and advocacy against domestic violence.

The group stopped four people pretending to be law enforcement from robbing a blind man whose pockets they purported to be lawfully searching. Red Dragon notes that the group has also "stopped car-jackings, helped stranded vehicles on the highways, stopped people from driving drunk, chased down and aided in the apprehension of a sex-offender, and even escorted people to their cars late at night". They have dealt with a man making threatening statements while swinging a golf club. On May Day, 2012, El Caballero, Midnight Jack, and Phoenix Jones confronted vandals damaging an old federal courthouse.

On May 29, 2014, Phoenix Jones officially declared that the Rain City Superhero Movement was over. On February 6, 2022, Chris Piers, a member of Phoenix's team called Omega, publicly revealed his identity and reminisced about his experiences and misgivings about his involvement in the "movement" in a video on his YouTube channel, Comic Tropes. In his video, Piers expressed his eventual disillusionment with the group after around a year of participating in their patrols which eventually led to his leaving of the movement. He recalled a story in which the team had cornered a purse-snatcher in a parking garage when some members of the group pulled stun guns on the man, who was cowering on the ground. Piers and Phoenix Jones both immediately told the members to put the weapons away.
