= Armageddon Expo =

New Zealand science fiction and comics convention

- Status: Active
- Genre: Science fiction Comic Con Multi-genre
- Locations: New Zealand: Auckland, Wellington, Christchurch, Tauranga.
- Inaugurated: 1995
- Attendance: A combined yearly attendance average of 120,000+ attendees
- Organizer: Beyond Reality Media Premiere Event Management Ltd
- Website: armageddonexpo.com

Armageddon Expo is a New Zealand owned and operated pop culture convention that holds multiple events around New Zealand in cities including Auckland, Wellington, Tauranga and Christchurch. The event, run by Beyond Reality Media Premier Event Management, has been running continuously since 1995. It has evolved from its roots of comics and trading cards to showcase computer and video gaming, animation, film and television, cosplay, comics, live wrestling, and retailers selling pop-culture merchandise.

The convention hosts celebrity guests from the worlds of movies, TV shows, animation, cosplay, YouTube, comics and gaming. Event attendees can meet guests, purchase autographs and photo opportunities as well as watch panels featuring the guests. Armageddon Expo is one of the largest public conventions held in New Zealand.

== History ==
Founded by William "Bill" and Adele Geradts, Armageddon began in Auckland, New Zealand on the weekend of 2 December 1995, at the Avondale Raceway. In 1997, the expo added a Wellington event, followed in 1999 by an event in Melbourne. Over the next 17 years, Armageddon held events in Australia sporadically. In 2007, the first Christchurch Armageddon event was held; Armageddon has also hosted events in other cities in New Zealand including Hamilton, Manukau, and Dunedin.

In Australia, two events were held in Adelaide and Sydney in 2011. Starting in 2007, annual events were held in Melbourne until 2014 when Beyond Reality Media handed management of its Australian Armageddon Expo to First Contact Conventions, after which the event was renamed to The Australian Movie & Comic Expo (AMC Expo).

After four annual events at Claudelands Arena (now Globox Arena) starting in 2012, Armageddon's Hamilton event was discontinued in 2015 due to high costs in the Waikato region. A single event was held in March 2016 at the Vodafone Events Centre (now Due Drop Events Centre) in Manukau, but did not continue at the venue.

In 2019, in the wake of the Christchurch mosque shootings, Armageddon changed its policy on weaponry and military attire, banning all realistic depictions. The new policy received some public criticism, however it was generally well-accepted.

Armageddon was expected to celebrate its 25th birthday in 2020, but event plans had to be altered due to the COVID-19 pandemic in New Zealand.

Armageddon Expo purchased the Auckland-based horror amusement attraction Spookers in 2020.

== Highlights ==
Current show events include:

- Celebrity Guest Panels, autograph and photo sessions.
- The Cosplay Contest.
- Exclusive Screenings
- Trivia Contests
- Cosplay Parade
- E-Sports
- Gaming and Card Tournaments

Armageddon hosts a variety of stalls run by companies from around NZ and internationally, with merchandise including comics, gaming, trading cards, anime, steampunk and memorabilia sales. At each event, there are numerous NZ and overseas comic creators and artists also selling their products.

== Venues and guest appearances ==
=== 1995–1999 ===
Dates	Location	Comic Guests	TV/Movie Guests	Animation Guests	Cosplay Guests	Other Guests
December 2–3, 1995	Avondale Raceway, Auckland					
August 25, 1996	Freemans Bay Community Centre, Auckland					
March 9, 1997	Freemans Bay Community Centre, Auckland					
August 17, 1997	Freemans Bay Community Centre, Auckland					
24 August 1997	Victoria University, Wellington					
21–22 March 1998	Alexander Raceway, Auckland	Kurt Busiek, Mark Waid, Devin Grayson				
28–29 March 1998	Wellington Raceway, Wellington	Kurt Busiek, Mark Waid, Devin Grayson				
3–4 October 1998	Aotea Centre, Auckland	Joe Kelly, Steven Seagle, Chris Bachalo				
29–30 May 1999	Aotea Centre, Auckland	Warren Ellis, Grant Morrison	Claudia Christian (Babylon 5), Chase Masterson (Star Trek: Deep Space Nine)			
5–6 June 1999	Melbourne Expo Centre, Melbourne, Australia	Warren Ellis, Grant Morrison	Claudia Christian (Babylon 5), Chase Masterson (Star Trek: Deep Space Nine)			

=== 2000–2009 ===
Dates	Location	Comic Guests	TV/Movie Guests	Animation Guests	Cosplay Guests	Other Guests
18–19 March 2000	Aotea Centre, Auckland	Arthur Adams, Joyce Chin, Jeph Loeb	Jeremy Bulloch (Star Wars), Lani Tupu (Farscape)			
10–11 February 2001	Aotea Centre, Auckland	Brian Michael Bendis, Walter Simonson, Louise Simonson, Diana Schutz	Teryl Rothery, Don S Davis, Peter Williams (Stargate SG-1) Virginia Hey (Farscape), Colin Baker, Katy Manning (Doctor Who), Ted Raimi, Kevin Smith (Xena: Warrior Princess)	Sean Schemmel & Christopher Sabat (Dragon Ball Z)		
26 May 2001	Aotea Centre, Auckland Invitational event: Buffy The Vampire Slayer		James Marsters, Emma Caulfield, Brian Thompson			
15–16 September 2001	Aotea Centre, Auckland	Roy Thomas	Wayne Pygram (Farscape), Marjean Holden (Crusade (TV series))	Sean Schemmel (Dragon Ball Z)		Che Fu
23–24 November 2002	Michael Fowler Centre, Wellington	Bradley Kahl and Christian Gossett (Team Red Star)	Sandi Finlay (Star Wars: Episode II – Attack of the Clones), Amanda Tapping, Teryl Rothery, Don S. Davis (Stargate SG-1)	Mariah Martin (Amazing Nurse Nanako), Kyle Hebert (Dragon Ball Z)		Salmonella Dub
12–14 April 2003	Aotea Centre, Auckland	John Cassaday, Mark Bagley, Christian Gossett	Sandi Finlay (Star Wars: Episode II – Attack of the Clones), Amanda Tapping, Teryl Rothery, Don S. Davis (Stargate SG-1)	Mira Furlan (Babylon 5), Gil Gerard, Erin Gray (Buck Rogers in the 25th Century), Brent Stait (Andromeda), Anthony Simcoe (Farscape), Tony Amendola (Stargate SG-1), Kenny Baker (Star Wars), Robert Picardo (Star Trek: Voyager)		
20–22 September 2003	Michael Fowler Centre, Wellington	Mark Bagley, Christian Gossett	Peter Mayhew (Star Wars), David Prowse (Star Wars), Garrett Wang (Star Trek: Voyager)	Kazuko Tadano, Hiromi Matushita, Christopher Sabat (Dragon Ball Z), Veronica Taylor (Pokémon), Darren Dunstan (Yu-Gi-Oh!), Jonathan Ross (Yu-Gi-Oh)		
16–18 April 2004	Aotea Centre, Auckland	Alex Maleev, Marc Silvestri, Brian Michael Bendis	John Rhys-Davies, Bruce Hopkins (The Lord of the Rings), Mark Ferguson, Lawrence Makoare, George Takei, Anthony Montgomery (Star Trek), Corin Nemec (Stargate SG-1), Xenia Seeberg (Lexx)	Eric Vale (Dragon Ball Z), Wayne Grayson (Yu-Gi-Oh), Megan Hollingshead (Pokémon), David Kaye (Transformers Armada)		
25–26 September 2004	Queens Wharf Events Centre, Wellington	Stuart Immonen, David Finch	John Rhys-Davies, Sean Astin, Andy Serkis, Thomas Robins, Sarah McLeod, Jed Brophy (The Lord of the Rings), Cirroc Lofton, Penny Johnson Jerald (Star Trek: Deep Space Nine)	Stephanie Nadolny (Dragon Ball GT), Dan Green, Wayne Grayson (Yu-Gi-Oh!), Joshua Seth (Duel Masters/Digimon)		
16–17 April 2005	Queens Wharf Events Centre, Wellington	Scott Lobdell	Connor Trinneer (Star Trek: Enterprise), Ray Park (Star Wars/X-Men), Daniel Logan (Star Wars), Devon Murray (Harry Potter), Raelee Hill, Rebecca Riggs (Farscape)	Amy Birnbaum, Jonathan Ross (Yu-Gi-Oh!), Milton Lawrence (Duel Masters), Sean Schemmel (Dragon Ball Z)		
22–24 October 2005	Aotea Centre, Auckland	Christian Gossett, Mark Waid, Michael Turner, Francis Manapul	Gates McFadden (Star Trek: The Next Generation), John Rhys-Davies (The Lord of the Rings), Richard Hatch (Battlestar Galactica), Torri Higginson, Rainbow Sun Francks (Stargate Atlantis), Cliff Simon (Stargate SG-1), Dean Haglund (The X-Files), Julie Caitlin Brown, Robin Atkin Downes (Babylon 5), Nicole DeBoer (The Dead Zone), Jay Laga'aia (Star Wars: Episode II – Attack of the Clones)	Joshua Seth (Duel Masters), Dan Green (Yu-Gi-Oh!), Sonny Strait (Dragon Ball Z)		
29–30 April 2006	Queens Wharf Events Centre, Wellington	Geoff Johns, Phil Jimenez	John Schneider (The Dukes of Hazzard / Smallville), John Billingsley (Star Trek: Enterprise), Claudia Christian (Babylon 5), Jewel Staite (Firefly/Serenity)	Mike McFarland, Sean Schemmel (Dragon Ball Z), Rodger Bumpass (SpongeBob SquarePants), Brian Beacock (Battle B-Daman)		
21–23 October 2006	Aotea Centre, Auckland	Arthur Suydam, Gary Frank	Rachel Luttrell (Stargate Atlantis), David Nykl (Stargate Atlantis), Colin Cunningham, Tony Amendola (Stargate SG-1), Summer Glau (Firefly/Serenity), Mira Furlan (Lost), Clare Kramer (Buffy the Vampire Slayer/Bring It On), Tom Lenk (Buffy the Vampire Slayer), Kevin Weisman (Alias)	Kevin Conroy (Batman: The Animated Series), Darren Dunstan (Yu-Gi-Oh!), Jennifer Hale (Powerpuff Girls), Vic Mignogna (Fullmetal Alchemist), Steve Blum (Cowboy Bebop)		
14–15 April 2007	Christchurch Convention Centre, Christchurch	Brian K. Vaughan, Jimmy Cheung	Avery Brooks (Star Trek: Deep Space Nine), John Rhys-Davies (The Lord of the Rings), Don S. Davis (Stargate SG-1)	Maile Flanagan (Naruto), Susan Eisenberg (Justice League), Crispin Freeman (Hellsing), Carolyn Lawrence (SpongeBob SquarePants)		
21–22 April 2007	TSB Arena – Wellington	Brian K. Vaughan, Jimmy Cheung	Billy Dee Williams (Star Wars), Doug Jones (Hellboy/Fantastic 4), Aaron Douglas (Battlestar Galactica), John Rhys-Davies (The Lord of the Rings), Don S. Davis (Stargate SG-1)	Susan Eisenberg (Justice League), Crispin Freeman (Hellsing), Carolyn Lawrence (SpongeBob SquarePants), Maile Flanagan, Yuri Lowenthal, Tara Platt (Naruto)		
19 August 2007	Auckland A Day with the Doctor (Doctor Who convention)		Sylvester McCoy (the Seventh Doctor), David Weston, William Gaunt			
13–14 October 2007	Melbourne Exhibition Centre, Melbourne, Australia	Amanda Conner, Jimmy Palmiotti, Gail Simone, Nicola Scott	Alan Tudyk (Serenity), John Wesley Shipp (The Flash), Jane Badler (V), Connor Trinneer (Star Trek: Enterprise), Peter Woodward (Crusade), Joe Flanigan (Stargate Atlantis), Chris Rankin (Harry Potter)	Billy West (Futurama), Richard Horvitz (Invader Zim), Stephanie Sheh (Naruto), Neil Kaplan (Transformers), Rodger Bumpass (SpongeBob SquarePants), Rino Romano (Sailor Moon)		Rob Van Dam, Jasmine St. Clair, Sabu (WWE)
20–22 October 2007	Aotea Centre, Auckland	Amanda Conner, Jimmy Palmiotti, Gail Simone, Nicola Scott	Connor Trinneer (Star Trek: Enterprise), Christopher Judge (Stargate SG-1), Ellen Muth (Dead Like Me), Peter Woodward (Crusade), Joe Flanigan (Stargate Atlantis), Chris Rankin (Harry Potter)	Billy West (Futurama), Richard Horvitz (Invader Zim), Stephanie Sheh (Naruto), Neil Kaplan (Transformers), Rodger Bumpass (SpongeBob SquarePants), Rino Romano (Sailor Moon)		Rob Van Dam, Christy Hemme (WWE), Raven (TNA)
19–20 April 2008	TSB Arena, Wellington	Hynden Walch (Teen Titans)	Christopher Judge, Alexis Cruz (Stargate SG-1), Matthew John Armstrong (Heroes), Tracy Scoggins (Babylon 5)			
26–27 April 2008	Christchurch Convention Centre, Christchurch	Jim Lee, JJ Kirby, Sandra Hope, Livio Ramondelli, Joel Gomez, Eddie Nunez, Beth Sotelo	Christopher Judge, Alexis Cruz (Stargate SG-1), Matthew John Armstrong (Heroes), Tracy Scoggins (Babylon 5), David Hewlett, Andee Frizzell, Kavan Smith, Gary Jones (Stargate Atlantis), Doug Jones (Hellboy), Margot Kidder (Superman Film Series) Ernie Hudson (Ghostbusters)	Nalini Krishan (Star Wars Episode II: Attack of the Clones), Johnny Yong Bosch (Bleach), Grey DeLisle (Avatar: The Last Airbender), Dave Wittenberg (Naruto), Crispin Freeman (Hellsing)		The Sandman
25–27 October 2008	Aotea Centre, Auckland	Jim Lee, JJ Kirby, Sandra Hope, Livio Ramondelli, Joel Gomez, Eddie Nunez, Beth Sotelo	David Hewlett, Andee Frizzell, Kavan Smith, Gary Jones, Doug Jones, Margot Kidder, Ernie Hudson	Johnny Yong Bosch, Grey DeLisle, Dave Wittenberg, Crispin Freeman		The Sandman
28–29 March 2009	Christchurch Convention Centre, Christchurch	Darick Robertson (comic book artist), Queenie Chan (manga writer/artist)	Peter Davison (Doctor Who), Michael Hurst (Hercules), Kevin Sorbo (Hercules/Andromeda/Meet the Spartans), Michael Winslow (Police Academy), Mark Strickson (Doctor Who – Turlough), Jonny Fairplay (Survivor/Fear Factor/TNA), Sam J. Jones (Flash Gordon), Michelle Deighton (America's Next Top Model)	Bill Farmer, Colleen Clinkenbeard (voice actor; One Piece/Fullmetal Alchemist), Greg Cipes (voice actor; Ben 10: Alien Force/Teen Titans), Brina Palencia (voice actor; Black Cat/One Piece/Fullmetal Alchemist)		
4–5 April 2009	TSB Arena, Wellington	Darick Robertson (comic book artist), Queenie Chan (manga writer/artist),	Peter Davison (Doctor Who), Michael Hurst (Hercules), Kevin Sorbo (Hercules/Andromeda/Meet the Spartans), Michael Winslow (Police Academy), Mark Strickson (Doctor Who – Turlough), Jonny Fairplay (Survivor/Fear Factor/TNA), Sam J. Jones (Flash Gordon), Michelle Deighton (America's Next Top Model)	Colleen Clinkenbeard (voice actor; One Piece/Fullmetal Alchemist), Greg Cipes (voice actor; Ben 10: Alien Force/Teen Titans), Brina Palencia (voice actor; Black Cat/One Piece/Fullmetal Alchemist), Bill Farmer (voice actor/voice of Goofy)		
17–18 October 2009	Melbourne Exhibition Centre, Melbourne	Peter David (comic book writer), Nicola Scott (comic book artist), Greg Rucka (comic book writer), Matthew Clark, Bill Sienkiewicz (comic book artist)	Joe Flanigan, Jason Momoa, Paul McGillion (Stargate Atlantis); Noah Grey-Cabey (Heroes); Cameron Bright, Christopher Heyerdahl, Bronson Pelletier (New Moon); Gigi Edgley (Farscape);	Seth Green, Matthew Senreich, Tom Root (Robot Chicken), Greg Cipes (Teen Titans/Ben 10: Alien Force), Travis Willingham (Fullmetal Alchemist), Laura Bailey (Soul Eater), Sean Schemmel (Dragon Ball Z), Dante Basco, Olivia Hack (Avatar)		
24–26 October 2009	ASB Showgrounds, Auckland	Peter David (comic book writer), Greg Rucka (comic book writer), Matthew Clark, Bill Sienkiewicz (comic book artist)	Joe Flanigan, Jason Momoa, Paul McGillion (Stargate Atlantis), Bronson Pelletier (New Moon); Gigi Edgley (Farscape)	Seth Green, Matthew Senreich, Tom Root (Robot Chicken), Craig Horner, Craig Parker, Tabrett Bethell, Mark Beesley, Bridget Regan (Legend of the Seeker), Michael Winslow (Police Academy), Greg Cipes (Teen Titans/Ben 10: Alien Force), Travis Willingham (Fullmetal Alchemist), Laura Bailey (Soul Eater), Sean Schemmel (Dragon Ball Z); Dante Basco, Olivia Hack (Avatar), Steve Downes (Halo)		

=== 2010–2019 ===
Dates	Location	Comic Guests	TV/Movie Guests	Animation Guests	Cosplay Guests	Other Guests
27–28 March 2010	Christchurch Convention Centre, Christchurch	Christian Gossett, Michael Allred, Francis Manapul, Nicola Scott	Michael Winslow, Marion Ramsey Police Academy, James Kyson Lee (Heroes), Dominic Keating, John Billingsley (Star Trek: Enterprise), Bonita Friedericy (Chuck), Paul McGann (Doctor Who), René Auberjonois (Star Trek: Deep Space Nine), Chaske Spencer (The Twilight Saga: New Moon).	Steve Blum (Wolverine and the X-Men), Tom Gibis (Naruto), Michael McConnohie (Warcraft) and (Vampire Hunter D) and Melodee Spevack (Digimon)		Robert Rankin
2–4 April 2010	TSB Bank Arena, Wellington	Christian Gossett, Michael Allred, Francis Manapul, Nicola Scott	Michael Winslow, Marion Ramsey (Police Academy), James Kyson Lee (Heroes), Dominic Keating, John Billingsley (Star Trek: Enterprise), Bonita Friedericy (Chuck), Paul McGann (Doctor Who), René Auberjonois (Star Trek: Deep Space Nine), Chaske Spencer (The Twilight Saga: New Moon)	Steve Blum (Wolverine and the X-Men), Tom Gibis (Naruto), Michael McConnohie (Warcraft, Vampire Hunter D), Melodee Spevack (Digimon)		Robert Rankin
8–9 May 2010	Castle Complex Otago University, Dunedin New Zealand Anime Convention			Johnny Yong Bosch		
16–17 October 2010	Melbourne Exhibition Centre, Melbourne, Australia	Daniel Way, Darick Robertson, Lar deSouza, Ryan Sohmer, Georges Jeanty	Ben Browder (Farscape, Stargate SG-1), Michael Shanks (Stargate SG-1), Juliet Landau (Buffy the Vampire Slayer), Michelle Forbes (Battlestar Galactica, True Blood), Paul McGann, Sylvester McCoy, Sophie Aldred (Doctor Who), Jerri Manthey, Jonny Fairplay (Survivor) David Faustino Married... with Children, Michael Biehn (The Terminator, Aliens), Torri Higginson (Stargate Atlantis), Claudia Christian (Babylon 5), Lloyd Kaufman (Troma Entertainment), Bruce Hopkins (LOTRS) and Miracle Laurie (Dollhouse)	Bill Farmer, Mela Lee, Vic Mignogna (Fullmetal Alchemist), John DiMaggio (Futurama) and James Tucker (Warner Bros.)		
23–25 October 2010	ASB Showgrounds, Auckland	Daniel Way, Darick Robertson, Lar deSouza, Ryan Sohmer, Georges Jeanty and Nicola Scott	Michael Shanks (Stargate SG-1), Paul McGann, Sylvester McCoy, Sophie Aldred (Doctor Who), Jerri Manthey, Jonny Fairplay (Survivor) David Faustino (Married... with Children), Michael Biehn (The Terminator, Aliens), Torri Higginson (Stargate Atlantis), Claudia Christian (Babylon 5), Lloyd Kaufman (Troma Entertainment), Miracle Laurie (Dollhouse)	Bill Farmer, Mela Lee (Vampire Knight), Vic Mignogna (Fullmetal Alchemist), John DiMaggio (Futurama), James Tucker (Warner Bros.).		
26–27 February 2011	Sydney Showgrounds, Sydney, Australia		Patricia Tallman (Babylon 5), Renee O'Connor, Hudson Leick (Xena: Warrior Princess), David Anders (Heroes), Lance Henriksen, John Rhys-Davies (The Lord of the Rings), Laura Vandervoort (Smallville), James Clement, Ami Cusack (Survivor), Ryan Robbins, Colin Cunningham (Stargate SG-1), Rainbow Sun Francks, David Hewlett (Stargate Atlantis), Karen Allen, Christopher Heyerdahl			
5–6 March 2011	Royal Adelaide Showgrounds, Adelaide, Australia		Patricia Tallman (Babylon 5), Renee O'Connor, Hudson Leick (Xena: Warrior Princess), David Anders (Heroes), Lance Henriksen, John Rhys-Davies (The Lord of the Rings), Laura Vandervoort (Smallville), James Clement, Ami Cusack (Survivor), Ryan Robbins, Colin Cunningham (Stargate SG-1), Rainbow Sun Francks, David Hewlett (Stargate Atlantis), Karen Allen, Christopher Heyerdahl			
2–3 April 2011	Christchurch Convention Center, Christchurch	Postponed due to the 2011 Christchurch earthquake				
9–10 April 2011	TSB Arena, Wellington	Jimmy Palmiotti, Amanda Conner.	John Rhys-Davies (The Lord of the Rings), Colin Baker, John Leeson (Doctor Who), Katee Sackhoff (Battlestar Galactica) Kristanna Loken (Terminator 3: Rise of the Machines)	Paul Eiding (Ben 10), Johnny Yong Bosch (Bleach), Michael Sinterniklaas (The Venture Bros.)		
4–5 June 2011	Castle Complex, Otago University, Dunedin NZ Anime convention			Kristi Reed, Kari Wahlgren		
2–3 July 2011	Addington Raceway, Christchurch					The Almighty Johnsons, Ben Barrington, Emmett Skilton, Tim Balme, Jared Turner
22–23 October 2011	Melbourne Exhibition Centre, Melbourne, Australia	Rob Guillory, Fred Van Lente, Frank Cho	Adrian Paul (Highlander), Agam Darshi (Sanctuary) Alaina Huffman (Stargate Universe) Amanda Tapping (Stargate/Sanctuary) Callum Blue (Smallville), Jeff Lewis (The Guild), Kelly Donovan (Buffy the Vampire Slayer), Lance Guest, Catherine Mary Stewart (The Last Starfighter), Tom Braidwood, Dean Haglund, Bruce Harwood (The Lone Gunmen) Louise Jameson Doctor Who, Mark Ryan (Transformers), Mark Sheppard (Supernatural/Doctor Who), W. Morgan Sheppard (Babylon 5 & Doctor Who), Nicholas Brendon (Buffy the Vampire Slayer), Robert Picardo (Star Trek: Voyager/Atlantis), Robin Dunne (Sanctuary), Sandeep Parikh (The Guild), Sylvester McCoy (Doctor Who)	Kevin Conroy, Kyle Hebert, Paul Eiding, Scott McCord, Steve Blum		
28–31 October 2011	ASB Showgrounds, Auckland	Rob Guillory, Fred Van Lente, Frank Cho	Adrian Paul (Highlander) Agam Darshi (Sanctuary) Alaina Huffman, Amanda Tapping (Stargate/Sanctuary), Jeff Lewis (The Guild), Kelly Donovan (Buffy the Vampire Slayer), Louise Jameson (Doctor Who), Mark Ryan (Transformers), Mark Sheppard (Supernatural/Doctor Who), W. Morgan Sheppard (Babylon 5/Doctor Who), Nicholas Brendon (Buffy the Vampire Slayer), Sandeep Parikh (The Guild), Sylvester McCoy (Doctor Who)	Kevin Conroy, Kyle Hebert, Paul Eiding, Scott McCord, Steve Blum		
14–15 April 2012	Claudelands Arena, Hamilton	Dave Johnson, Ron Marz	Bronson Pelletier, Tinsel Korey (Twilight (2008 film)), John Levene (Doctor Who), Julie McNiven (Supernatural), Paul McGillion (Stargate Atlantis) Teryl Rothery (Stargate SG-1), Emmett Skilton, Jared Turner, Ben Barrington (The Almighty Johnsons)	Brian Beacock (Battle B-Daman), Vic Mignogna (Fullmetal Alchemist), Dave Wittenberg (Naruto)		
21–22 April 2012	TSB Bank Arena, Wellington	Dave Johnson, Carlo Pagulayan Ron Marz	Bronson Pelletier, Tinsel Korey (Twilight (2008 film)), John Levene (Doctor Who), Julie McNiven (Supernatural), Paul McGillion (Stargate Atlantis) Teryl Rothery (Stargate SG-1), Emmett Skilton, Jared Turner, Ben Barrington, Dean O'Gorman (The Almighty Johnsons)	Brian Beacock (Battle B-Daman), Vic Mignogna (Fullmetal Alchemist), Dave Wittenberg (Naruto)		
30 June–1 July 2012	Addington Raceway, Christchurch		Callum Blue (Smallville) Sylvester McCoy (Doctor Who)	Colleen Clinkenbeard (One Piece)		Christopher Paolini
12–14 October 2012	Melbourne Exhibition Centre, Melbourne, Australia	Bob Layton, Ian Churchill	Aldis Hodge (Leverage), Aron Eisenberg (Star Trek DS9), Bruce Boxleitner (Babylon 5), Christopher Heyerdahl (Hell on Wheels), Christopher Judge (Stargate SG-1), Cindy Morgan (TRON), Finn Jones, Miltos Yerolemou (Game of Thrones), George Lazenby (James Bond), Jim Beaver (Supernatural), Karl Urban (Judge Dredd), Mark Pellegrino (Supernatural), Martin Klebba (Pirates of the Caribbean), Rachel Grant (Die Another Day), Sebastian Roche (Vampire Diaries), Terry Molloy (Doctor Who)	Kristi Reed, Mela Lee (Vampire Knight) Johnny Yong Bosch (Bleach), Charles Martinet (Mario Games), Lex Lang, Sandy Fox, Susan Eisenberg (JLU), Marin Miller and Bea Billany (Yu-Gi-Oh! The Abridged Series)	Yaya Han	Bushwhacker Luke
19–22 October 2012	ASB Showgrounds, Auckland	Bob Layton, Harvey Tolibao, Ian Churchill	Aldis Hodge (Leverage), Aron Eisenberg (Star Trek DS9), Bruce Boxleitner (Babylon 5), Christopher Heyerdahl (Hell on Wheels), Christopher Judge (Stargate SG-1), Cindy Morgan (TRON), Finn Jones, Miltos Yerolemou (Game of Thrones), Jim Beaver (Supernatural), Mark Pellegrino (Supernatural), Sebastian Roche (Vampire Diaries), Terry Molloy (Doctor Who),Temuera Morrison (Fresh Meat)	Kristi Reed, Mela Lee (Vampire Knight) Johnny Yong Bosch (Bleach), Charles Martinet (Mario Games), Lex Lang, Sandy Fox, Susan Eisenberg (JLU), Marin Miller and Bea Billany (Yu-Gi-Oh! The Abridged Series)		Bushwhacker Luke
2–3 March 2013	The Edgar Centre, Dunedin		Dean O'Gorman, Jed Brophy, William Kircher, Peter Hambleton	Greg Cipes (Ben 10: Alien Force, Teen Titans, Teenage Mutant Ninja Turtles)		
9–10 March 2013	Addington Raceway, Christchurch		Dean O'Gorman, Jed Brophy, William Kircher, Peter Hambleton	Dante Basco (Avatar: The Last Airbender, American Dragon: Jake Long, Hook)		
25–26 May 2013	Claudelands Arena, Hamilton		Mitch Pileggi (The X-Files)	Yeardley Smith (The Simpsons)		
1–3 June 2013	Westpac Stadium, Wellington	Dean Rankine (Bonzo Comics) and Gail Simone (Batgirl)	Jason Momoa (Game of Thrones), Joe Flanigan (Stargate Atlantis), Lance Henriksen (Aliens) Mitch Pileggi (X-Files) and Tony Amendola (Once Upon a Time), Sylvester McCoy, Luke Evans, Adam Brown, Aidan Turner, Dean O'Gorman, Graham McTavish, James Nesbitt, Jed Brophy, John Callen, Mark Hadlow, Peter Hambleton, Stephen Hunter, William Kircher	Christopher Smith (Monsuno), Janet Varney (The Legend of Korra), Meagan Smith (Ben 10), Yeardley Smith (The Simpsons)		
19–20 October 2013	Melbourne Showgrounds, Melbourne, Australia		Mark Rolston, Corey Feldman, Evanna Lynch, Billy Boyd, Ben Browder, Temuera Morrison, Nell Campbell, Gigi Edgley, Dean Stockwell, Dwight Schultz, Claudia Black, Ty Olsson, Ian McNeice, Catrin Stewart, Dan Starkey, Simon Fisher-Becker, Barry Bostwick, Richard Hatch, Robbie Jarvis, Jason Carter, Kim Rhodes, Norman Lovett, Rick Worthy, Tony Amendola			Richard Arnold
25–28 October 2013	ASB Showgrounds, Auckland		Mark Rolston, Evanna Lynch, Billy Boyd, Ben Browder, Stephen Hunter, John Callen, Gigi Edgley, Dean Stockwell, Dwight Schultz, Ty Olsson, Ian McNeice, Catrin Stewart, Dan Starkey, Simon Fisher-Becker, Barry Bostwick, Robbie Jarvis, Jason Carter, Kim Rhodes, Norman Lovett, Rick Worthy, Tony Amendola			
1–2 March 2014	Edgar Centre, Dunedin		Colin Baker, Nicola Bryant, Mark Strickson, Mark Hadlow, John Callen	Steve Blum		
8–9 March 2014	Addington Raceway, Christchurch		Colin Baker, Nicola Bryant, Mark Strickson, Mark Hadlow, John Callen	Steve Blum		
24–25 May 2014	Claudelands Arena, Hamilton	Bill Sienkiewicz, Tom Taylor	Michael Rowe (Arrow), Christopher Judge (Stargate SG-1), DJ Qualls, James Patrick Stuart, Jake Abel, Samantha Ferris, Steven Williams (Supernatural), John Callen, Mark Hadlow (The Hobbit)	Paul Eiding (Ben 10), William Salyers (Regular Show), Charles Martinet (Mario Games)		Chii Sakurabi
31 May-2 June 2014	Westpac Stadium, Wellington	Bill Sienkiewicz, Tom Taylor	Michael Rowe, David Ramsey, Manu Bennett (Arrow), Christopher Judge (Stargate SG-1), DJ Qualls, James Patrick Stuart, Jake Abel, Samantha Ferris, Steven Williams (Supernatural), John Callen, Mark Hadlow, Peter Hambleton (The Hobbit), Taika Waititi, Jemaine Clement, Jonny Brugh, Ben Fransham (What We Do in the Shadows), Frazer Hines (Doctor Who)	Paul Eiding (Ben 10), William Salyers (Regular Show), Charles Martinet (Mario Games), Jessica DiCicco (Adventure Time)		Chii Sakurabi
18–19 October 2014	Melbourne Showgrounds, Melbourne, Australia	Kevin Eastman, Alan Robinson, Darick Robertson, James Tynion IV, John Layman, Kyle Higgins, Dean Rankine, Wayne Nichols, Adam Nichols	Jenna Coleman, Sarah Madison (Doctor Who), AJ Buckley, Travis Wester, Alaina Huffman (Supernatural), Cliff Simon, Peter Williams, Jacqueline Samuda, Suanne Braun, David Hewlett, David Nykl (Stargate), Giancarlo Esposito (Breaking Bad), Helen Slater (Supergirl), Margot Kidder (Superman films), Mira Furlan (Babylon 5), Judson Scott (Star Trek), Michael Hogan (Battlestar Galactica, Teen Wolf), Jim Duggan (WWE), Peter Hambleton (The Hobbit), Matt Doran (The Matrix)	Greg Cipes (Teen Titans), Jason Spisak (Young Justice), Roger Jackson (The Powerpuff Girls), Sean Schemmel (Dragon Ball Z), William Salyers (Regular Show)		Robert Rankin (British humorous novelist), Terry Brooks (Shannara series)
24–27 October 2014	ASB Showgrounds, Auckland	Kevin Eastman, Alan Robinson, Darick Robertson, James Tynion IV, John Layman, Kyle Higgins	Richard Dean Anderson (SG-1, MacGyver), Jenna Coleman, Sarah Madison (Doctor Who), AJ Buckley, Travis Wester, DJ Qualls (Supernatural), Cliff Simon, Peter Williams, Jacqueline Samuda, Suanne Braun, David Hewlett, David Nykl (Stargate), Giancarlo Esposito (Breaking Bad), Helen Slater (Supergirl), Mira Furlan (Babylon 5), Judson Scott (Star Trek), Michael Hogan (Battlestar Galactica, Teen Wolf), Jim Duggan (WWE), William Kircher (The Hobbit), Barry Duffield (Spartacus), Jemaine Clement, Jonny Brugh, Cori Gonzalez-Macuer, Stu Rutherford, Jackie Van Beek, Ben Fransham (What We Do in the Shadows), Lucas Till (X-Men)	Greg Cipes (Teen Titans), Jason Spisak (Young Justice), Roger Jackson (The Powerpuff Girls), Sean Schemmel (Dragon Ball Z), William Salyers (Regular Show)		Robert Rankin (British humorous novelist), Terry Brooks (Shannara series)
28 February-1 March 2015	More FM Arena, Dunedin	Darick Robertson, Dean Rankine	Alaina Huffman (Supernatural), DJ Qualls (Supernatural), Simon Fisher-Becker (Doctor Who).	Eric Stuart (Pokémon)		Robert Rankin (British humorous novelist), Terry Brooks (Shannara series)
7–8 March 2015	Horncastle Arena, Christchurch	Darick Robertson, Dean Rankine	Karl Urban (Dredd, Star Trek, LOTR), Katee Sackhoff (Battlestar Galactica), Manu Bennett (Arrow, The Hobbit Trilogy), Alaina Huffman (Supernatural), DJ Qualls (Supernatural), Simon Fisher-Becker (Doctor Who), Armin Shimerman (Star Trek: DS9, Buffy the Vampire Slayer), Kitty Swink (Star Trek: DS9), Adam Brown (The Hobbit Trilogy).	Eric Stuart (Pokémon), Colleen O'Shaughnessey (Digimon)		
14–15 March 2015	Claudelands Arena, Hamilton	Darick Robertson, Dean Rankine	Manu Bennett (Arrow, The Hobbit Trilogy), John Rhys-Davies (LOTR, Indiana Jones), Alaina Huffman (Supernatural), Simon Fisher-Becker (Doctor Who), Armin Shimerman (Star Trek: DS9, Buffy the Vampire Slayer), Kitty Swink (Star Trek: DS9), Adam Brown (The Hobbit Trilogy), Graham McTavish (The Hobbit Trilogy, Outlander TV series), Martin Klebba (The Pirates of the Caribbean)	Eric Stuart (Pokémon), Colleen O'Shaughnessey (Digimon)		
17–19 July 2015	Westpac Stadium, Wellington	Stephen Bissette (Swamp Thing)	Dean Haglund (X-Files), Jed Brophy and William Kircher (The Hobbit), Jim Beaver, Sebastian Roche (Supernatural), Corin Nemec (Stargate SG-1), Robert Maschio (Scrubs), Karen Gillan (Doctor Who), Rick Mora (Twilight), Saginaw Grant (Lone Ranger)	Courtenay Taylor (Regular Show), Matthew Mercer (Attack on Titan), Veronica Taylor (Pokémon), Joshua Seth (Digimon)	Monika Lee and Riddlev	Ted DiBiase (The Million Dollar Man)
23–26 October 2015	ASB Showgrounds, Auckland	Christian Gossett (The Red Star), Kevin McGuire (JLI), Zander Cannon (Top 10), Dave Johnson (100 Bullets)	TV/Movie star Guests – Natalia Tena and Keisha Castle-Hughes (Game of Thrones), Alex Heartman and Azim Rizk (Power Rangers), Lou Diamond Phillips (SGU), Sean Maher (Serenity), Michael Rowe and Manu Bennett (Arrow), John Wesley Shipp (The Flash), Rachel Miner and Nicki Aycox (Supernatural), Casper Van Dien and Dina Meyer (Starship Troopers), Rainbow Sun Francks (Stargate Atlantis), Richard Franklin (Doctor Who), Bernie Kophel (Get Smart), Robert Maschio (Scrubs)	Cristina Vee (Sailor Moon), Chuck Huber (Dragon Ball Z), Mela Lee (Fate/Stay Night), Hal Rayle (Animation Legend), Maggie Roswell (The Simpsons)		Jake 'The Snake' Roberts, Aimee Blackschleger
5–6 March 2016	Vodafone Events Centre, Auckland	Dean Rankine (Simpsons Comics), Christian Gossett (The red star), Charles Soule (Letter 44)	Richard Dean Anderson (Stargate SG-1) and (MacGyver), Christopher Judge (Stargate SG-1 and The Dark Knight Rises), Ray Santiago (Ash vs. Evil Dead), Marina Sirtis (Star Trek: The Next Generation), David Nykl (Stargate Atlantis), Ruth Connell (Supernatural)	William Salyers, Mike McFarland, Paul Eiding	Riki Lecotey, Monika Lee.	Haku (King Tonga)
12–13 March 2016	Horncastle Arena, Christchurch	Christian Gossett (The red star), Charles Soule (Letter 44)	Richard Dean Anderson (Stargate SG-1) and (MacGyver), Christopher Judge (Stargate SG-1 and The Dark Knight Rises), Marina Sirtis (Star Trek: The Next Generation), David Nykl (Stargate Atlantis), Ruth Connell (Supernatural)	William Salyers, Mike McFarland, Paul Eiding	Riki Lecotey, Monika Lee.	Haku (King Tonga)
19–20 March 2016	More FM Arena, Dunedin	Christian Gossett (The red star), Charles Soule (Letter 44)	Christopher Judge (Stargate SG-1 and The Dark Knight Rises), Marina Sirtis (Star Trek: The Next Generation), David Nykl (Stargate Atlantis)	William Salyers, Mike McFarland, Paul Eiding	Riki Lecotey, Monika Lee.	Haku (King Tonga)
4–6 June 2016	Westpac Stadium, Wellington	Carl Potts (Alien Legion, Punisher War Journal), Rachael Stott (Doctor Who comics, Star Trek/Planet of the Apes), Christian Gossett (The Red Star)	Rose McIver (iZombie, Once Upon a Time), David Giuntoli, Bitsie Tulloch (Grimm), Natalia Tena (Harry Potter, Game of Thrones), Robert Picardo (Star Trek: Voyager, Stargate Atlantis), Samuel Anderson (Doctor Who), Ray Santiago, Dana DeLorenzo (Ash vs. Evil Dead), Ted Raimi (Xena, Seaquest DSV), Tahmoh Penikett (Supernatural, Dollhouse, Battlestar Galactica), Cliff Simon (Stargate SG-1); Graham McTavish (Outlander, Creed, The Hobbit)	Stephanie Sheh (Sailor Moon, Naruto, Bleach, Eureka Seven), Michael Sinterniklaas (The Venture Bros., Teenage Mutant Ninja Turtles), Christy Carlson Romano (Kim Possible)	Tine Marie Riis, Eve Beauregard	The Honky Tonk Man.
11–12 March 2017	Horncastle Arena, Christchurch	Tom Taylor (Injustice: Gods Among Us), Colin Wilson (Dredd)	Billy Boyd (Lord of the Rings), Ray Fisher (Justice League), Chad L. Coleman (The Walking Dead), Miltos Yerolemou (Game of Thrones), Ivana Baquero (Shannara, Pan's Labyrinth)	Veronica Taylor (Pokémon), Christopher Corey Smith (Lego Batman games), Cindy Robinson (Sailor Moon)		
18–19 March 2017	More FM Arena, Dunedin	Tom Taylor (Injustice: Gods Among Us), Colin Wilson (Dredd)	Billy Boyd (Lord of the Rings), Ray Fisher (Justice League), Chad L. Coleman (The Walking Dead), Miltos Yerolemou (Game of Thrones)	Veronica Taylor (Pokémon), Christopher Corey Smith (Lego Batman games), Cindy Robinson (Sailor Moon), Hynden Walch (Teen Titans, Adventure Time)		
28–29 May	Baypark Arena, Tauranga	Todd Nauck (Spiderman/Deadpool, Young Justice, Doctor Who)	Jewel Staite (Firefly, Serenity, Stargate Atlantis), Matt Letscher (The Flash, Legends of Tomorrow), Franz Drameh (The Flash, Legends of Tomorrow), Richard Harmon (The 100), Sachin Sahel (The 100), Max Carver & Charlie Carver (Teen Wolf), Paul Amos (Lost Girl, Assassin's Creed Syndicate), Adrian Paul (Highlander), Patricia Tallman (Babylon 5).	Max Mittelman (One Punch Man), Ray Chase (Final Fantasy XV), Robbie Daymond (Sailor Moon Crystal, Final Fantasy XV), Kyle Hebert (Dragon Ball Z, Naruto)	Elffi, Calssara	
3–5 June	Westpac Stadium, Wellington	Todd Nauck (Spiderman/Deadpool, Young Justice, Doctor Who)	Mark Sheppard (Supernatural, Firefly), Alaina Huffman (Supernatural, Stargate Universe), Jewel Staite (Firefly, Serenity, Stargate Atlantis), Jeremy Jordan (Supergirl), Matt Letscher (The Flash, Legends of Tomorrow), Franz Drameh (The Flash, Legends of Tomorrow), Richard Harmon (The 100), Sachin Sahel (The 100), Max Carver & Charlie Carver (Teen Wolf), Paul Amos (Lost Girl, Assassin's Creed Syndicate), Adrian Paul (Highlander), Patricia Tallman (Babylon 5), Ivana Baquero (Pan's Labyrinth, Shannara), Andrew Lees (The Originals), John Levene (Doctor Who), Nathalie Boltt (Riverdale)	Max Mittelman (One Punch Man), Ray Chase (Final Fantasy XV), Robbie Daymond (Sailor Moon Crystal, Final Fantasy XV), Kyle Hebert (Dragon Ball Z, Naruto).	Elffi, Calssara	
21–24 October 2017	ASB Showgrounds, Auckland	David Lloyd (V For Vendetta), Jill Thompson (Wonder Woman, Scary Godmother), Troy Little (Powerpuff Girls), Brenda Hickey (My Little Pony)	John Barrowman (Doctor Who, Torchwood, Arrow), Tom Felton (Harry Potter, The Flash), Nathan Fillion (Firefly, Castle), Osric Chau (Supernatural), Ricky Whittle (The 100, American Gods), Erica Cerra (The 100), Holland Roden (Teen Wolf), Pom Klementieff (Guardians of the Galaxy 2), Enver Gjokaj (Agent Carter, Dollhouse), Walter Koenig (Star Trek), David Blue (Stargate Universe), Jacqueline Toboni (Grimm)	Amber Nash (Archer), Steve Downes, Jen Taylor (Halo), Bryce Papenbrook (Attack on Titan, Sword Art Online), Eric Stuart (Pokémon, Yu-Gi-Oh), John Stocker (Classic Voice Actor and Director).	Monika Lee, Jessica Nigri, Ashlynne Dae, Reagan Kathryn.	
30 March-1 April 2018	Westpac Stadium, Wellington		Jeremy Renner (Marvel's Avengers (film series)); Bonnie Wright from (Harry Potter (film series)), Matt Ryan (actor), Kim Rhodes, DJ Qualls, Christopher Larkin (actor), Christopher Larkin (actor), Chelsey Reist, Rahul Kohli, Aly Michalka, Cherami Leigh	Lauren Landa, Mike McFarland, David Sobolov, Mick Wingert, Ben Fransham, Jonathan Brugh, Al Barrionuevo, Ben Stenbeck	Jessica Nigri and Ashlynne Dae.	
26–27 May 2018	ASB Baypark Stadium, Tauranga	Sloane Leong	Katie McGrath (Supergirl, Merlin), Lauren German & Lesley-Ann Brandt (Lucifer), Paul Blackthorne, Katrina Law, Echo Kellum & David Nykl (Arrow), Daniel Portman (Game of Thrones), John Shea (Lois & Clark), Garrett Wang (Star Trek: Voyager)	Brad Swaile (Death Note, X-Men Evolution), David Sobolov (Guardians of the Galaxy, The Flash).	Ashlynne Dae, TV/Movie Guests,	'Hacksaw' Jim Duggan
2–4 June 2018	Horncastle Arena, Christchurch	Sloane Leong,	Katie McGrath (Supergirl, Merlin), Mehcad Brooks (Supergirl) Lauren German & Lesley-Ann Brandt (Lucifer), Paul Blackthorne, Katrina Law, Echo Kellum & David Nykl (Arrow), Daniel Portman (Game of Thrones), John Shea (Lois & Clark), Garrett Wang (Star Trek: Voyager)	Brad Swaile (Death Note, X-Men Evolution), David Sobolov (Guardians of the Galaxy, The Flash).	Ashlynne Dae	'Hacksaw' Jim Duggan
19–22 October 2018	ASB Showgrounds, Auckland	Eduardo Risso, Stephen B Jones, Jeff Johnson,	Christina Ricci (The Addams Family), Shannen Doherty (Charmed), Michael Shanks (Stargate SG-1), Katie Leung (Harry Potter), Ty Olsson, Osric Chau, Jeffrey Vincent Parise, David Haydn-Jones (Supernatural), Navid Negahban (Legion), Drew Powell (Gotham), Anna Hopkins (Shadowhunters), Jimmy Wong (Mulan 2020), Rhys Darby (Flight of the Conchords), Patricia Tallman (Babylon 5)	Arryn Zech, Kara Eberle, Elizabeth Maxwell (RWBY), Jason Liebrecht (My Hero Academia), Mark Meer, Belinda Cornish (Mass Effect), Sara Cravens (Injustice 2), Josh Grelle (Yuri on Ice), Yoshinori Asao (Fukushima Gainax)	Jessica Nigri, LeeAnna Vamp, Ashlynne Dae,	Openside, The Hillywood Show
13–15 April 2019	Westpac Stadium, Wellington	Babs Tarr, Andrew Griffith, Ryan K Lindsey.	Nicholas Hoult (X-Men films, Warm Bodies), Tom Welling (Smallville, Lucifer), Amy Acker (The Gifted, Person of Interest, Angel), James Carpinello (Gotham), Julian Richings (Supernatural, 12 Monkeys), Amber Midthunder (Legion, Roswell, New Mexico), Tati Gabrielle, Adeline Rudolph, Abigail Cowen (Chilling Adventures of Sabrina), Aimee Garcia (Lucifer), Ray Wise (Reaper, Twin Peaks), Officers Mike Minogue and Karen O'Leary (Wellington Paranormal).	Veronica Taylor (Pokémon, Dragon Ball Super, Sailor Moon), Trina Nishimura (Attack on Titan).		
1–3 June 2019	Horncastle Arena, Christchurch	Nick Dragotta, Jeff Johnson, Stephen B Jones.	Katherine McNamara, Luke Baines (Shadowhunters), Tricia Helfer (Lucifer, Battlestar Galactica), Graham McTavish, Lotte Verbeek (Outlander (TV series)), Amber Nash (Archer), Connor Trinneer, Dominic Keating (Star Trek: Voyager), Andrew Matarazzo (Teen Wolf), Officers Mike Minogue and Karen O'Leary (Wellington Paranormal).	Yuri Lowenthal, William Salyers, Tara Platt (Spider-Man (2017 TV series)).		
8–9 June 2019	ASB Baypark Stadium, Tauranga	Nick Dragotta, Jeff Johnson, Stephen B Jones	Katherine McNamara, Luke Baines (Shadowhunters), Tricia Helfer (Lucifer, Battlestar Galactica), Graham McTavish, Lotte Verbeek (Outlander (TV series)), Amber Nash (Archer), Connor Trinneer, Dominic Keating (Star Trek: Voyager), Andrew Matarazzo (Teen Wolf), Officers Mike Minogue and Karen O'Leary (Wellington Paranormal)	Yuri Lowenthal, William Salyers, Tara Platt (Spider-Man (2017 TV series))		
25–28 October 2019	ASB Showgrounds, Auckland	Dean Rankine	Jason Isaacs (Harry Potter), Jon Heder (Napoleon Dynamite), Sean Gunn (Guardians of the Galaxy), Ruth Connell (Supernatural), Sam Witwer (Battlestar Galactica), Inbar Lavi (Lucifer), Adam Croasdell (Preacher), Jodelle Ferland (Silent Hill), Natalia Cordova-Buckley (Agents of S.H.I.E.L.D.), Gregg Sulkin (Marvel's Runaways), Patricia Tallman (Babylon 5), Paul Amos (Lost Girl), Antonia Prebble (Westside), Wellington Paranormal.	Steve Blum, Mary Elizabeth McGlynn (Cowboy Bebop, Star Wars Rebels), Patricia Summersett (Legend of Zelda: Breath of the Wild), Leah Clark (My Hero Academia), Rikki Simons (Invader Zim).	Yaya Han	Mega64, Viva La Dirt League, Lita, The Honky Tonk Man.

=== 2020–present ===
Dates	Location	Comic Guests	TV/Movie Guests	Animation Guests	Cosplay Guests	Other Guests
10–12 April 2020	Sky Stadium, Wellington	Postponed due to the COVID-19 pandemic in New Zealand.				
18–19 July 2020	Baypark Arena, Tauranga (Note: Due to the COVID-19 pandemic in New Zealand, all guests were virtual unless otherwise noted.)	Lana Parrilla, Rebecca Mader, Sean Maguire (Once Upon a Time), John Barrowman (Doctor Who, Arrow), Mena Massoud (Aladdin), Danielle Panabaker, Danielle Nicolet (The Flash), Rachael Harris (Lucifer), Troy Baker (The Last of Us), Christopher Sabat (Dragon Ball Z)				
1–2 August 2020	Sky Stadium, Wellington	Lana Parrilla, Rebecca Mader, Sean Maguire (Once Upon a Time), John Barrowman (Doctor Who, Arrow), Melanie Scrofano (Wynonna Earp), Carlos Valdes, Danielle Nicolet (The Flash), Anthony Rapp (Star Trek: Discovery), Rachael Harris (Lucifer), Troy Baker (The Last of Us), Christopher Sabat (Dragon Ball Z)				
23–26 October 2020	ASB Showgrounds, Auckland	Jenna Coleman, Sacha Dhawan, Catherine Tate, John Barrowman (Doctor Who), Summer Glau (Firefly), Ian Somerhalder, Paul Wesley (Vampire Diaries), Lindsay Jones, Barbara Dunkelman, Kara Eberle, Arryn Zech (RWBY), Oded Fehr (The Mummy), Michael Rosenbaum (Smallville), Gavin Leatherwood (Chilling Adventures of Sabrina), David Ramsey (Arrow), Katherine McNamara, Luke Baines (Shadowhunters), Veronica Taylor (Pokémon), Rob Benedict, Richard Speight Jr., Felicia Day, Alexander Calvert (Supernatural), Amanda Tapping, Michael Shanks, Ben Browder (Stargate SG-1), Tom Cavanagh, Carlos Valdes, Danielle Nicolet, Danielle Panabaker (The Flash), Dichen Lachman (Altered Carbon), Anna Popplewell (Reign), Freddie Prinze Jr, Jon Lee Brody (GEGGHEAD), Bill Mumy, Ed Wasser, Claudia Christian, Josh Cox, Patricia Tallman, Peter Jurasik, Jason Carter (Babylon 5), Julie Benz, Juliet Landau (Buffy the Vampire Slayer), Sonequa Martin-Green, Anthony Rapp, Anson Mount, Emily Coutts, Jayne Brook, Mary Chieffo, Ken Mitchell (Star Trek: Discovery), Joe Flanigan, Rachel Luttrell (Stargate Atlantis), Harvey Guillen (What We Do in the Shadows), Holly Marie Combs, Drew Fuller (Charmed), Nolan North (Gaming), Nafessa Williams, Chantal Thuy (Black Lightning), Trace Lysette (Transparent), Summer Bishil, Hale Appleman, Stella Maeve, Brittany Curran, Jade Tailor (The Magicians), David Dastmalchian (Ant-Man), Dan Slott (Comics), Ashley Eckstein (Clone Wars), Christopher Sabat (Dragon Ball Z), Bridget Regan (Note: Attended in person, as this guest was already in New Zealand.) (Agent Carter), Graham McTavish (Outlander), Neil Sandilands (The Flash), Ivana Baquero (Pan's Labyrinth), Jonny Brugh (What We Do in the Shadows), Karen O'Leary, Mike Minogue (Wellington Paranormal)				
17–18 April 2021	Sky Stadium, Wellington	Brandon Routh (Superman Returns), Jesse Rath, Nicole Maines (Supergirl), Jes Macallan, Neal McDonough (Legends of Tomorrow), Matt Frewer (Max Headroom), Amanda Bearse, William Ragsdale (Fright Night), Giancarlo Esposito (The Mandalorian), Michelle Hurd (Star Trek: Picard), Mary Wiseman (Star Trek: Discovery), Nana Visitor (Star Trek: Deep Space Nine), Ashley Eckstein (Star Wars Rebels), Maile Flanagan (Note: Guest was available for virtual signings, not a traditional attendance.) (Naruto), Zeno Robinson (My Hero Academia), Stephanie Nadolny (Dragon Ball Z)				
29–30 May 2021	Christchurch Arena, Christchurch	Javicia Leslie, Rachel Skarsten, Camrus Johnson, Nicole Kang (Batwoman), Summer Glau (Firefly), Felicia Day (Supernatural), Jesse Rath, Nicole Maines (Supergirl), Kevin Alejandro (Lucifer), Amy Acker (Angel), Chris Conner (Altered Carbon), Kane Hodder (Horror), Alan Oppenheimer, Melendy Britt (Skeletor & She-Ra), King Vader (YouTube), Greg Baldwin (Avatar The Last Airbender), Stephanie Nadolny (Dragon Ball Z)				
12–13 June 2021	Baypark Arena, Tauranga	Jesse Rath, Nicole Maines (Supergirl), Giancarlo Esposito (The Mandalorian), Felicia Day, Emily Swallow, Robbie Thompson (Supernatural), Catherine Tate (Doctor Who), Robert Picardo, Robert Beltran (Star Trek Voyager), Kandyse McClure, Michael Trucco (Battlestar Galactica), Maile Flanagan (Naruto), Kari Wahlgren (Rick & Morty), Stephanie Nadolny (Dragon Ball Z)				
6–7 August 2021	Fly Palmy Arena, Palmerston North	Alan Tudyk (Firefly), Amanda Tapping (Stargate SG-1), Timothy Omundson (Galavant/Supernatural), Karyn Parsons, Joseph Marcell, Daphne Maxwell Reid (Fresh Prince of Belair), Danielle Panabaker, Tom Cavanagh (The Flash), Javicia Leslie, Rachel Skarsten, Meagan Tandy, Wallis Day (Batwoman), David Ramsey (Arrow), Kat Barrell (Wynonna Earp), Jill Harris, Dallas Reid (Black Clover), Christina Kelly (Food Wars)				
10–12 June 2022	Auckland Showgrounds, Auckland	Lauren Tom (Futurama, Supernatural), Meng'er Zhang (Shang-Chi and the Legend of the Ten Rings), Giancarlo Esposito (Better Call Saul, Far Cry 6, The Mandalorian), Teresa Palmer (Discovery of Witches), Javicia Leslie (Batwoman), Veronica Taylor, Rachael Lillis (Pokémon), Jim Byrnes (Highlander), Osric Chau (Supernatural, The Flash), Colleen O'Shaughnessey (Sonic the Hedgehog), Miles Luna, Samantha Ireland (RWBY), Cris George (My Hero Academia), Bryson Baugus (Attack on Titan), Viva La Dirt League				
23–24 July 2022	Baypark Arena, Tauranga	Melanie Scrofano (Wynonna Earp), Jon McLaren, Kimberly-Sue Murray, Alex Weiner, Jason Cavalier, Robert Montcalm (Guardians of the Galaxy game), Veronica Taylor, Rachael Lillis (Pokémon), Meng'er Zhang (Shang-Chi), Javicia Leslie (Batwoman), Michael Shanks (Stargate SG-1), Juliana Harkavy, Rick Gonzalez (Arrow), Grace Van Dien (Stranger Things), Mike McFarland (Dragon Ball Z, Attack on Titan), Joe Zieja (Fire Emblem)				
6–7 August 2022	Fly Palmy Arena, Palmerston North	Ross Marquand (The Walking Dead), Holland Roden, Colton Haynes (Teen Wolf), Jim Beaver (Supernatural), Veronica Taylor, Rachael Lillis (Pokémon), Michael Shanks (Stargate SG-1), Juliana Harkavy, Rick Gonzalez (Arrow), Mike McFarland (Dragon Ball Z, Attack on Titan), Joe Zieja (Fire Emblem)				
3–4 December 2022	Sky Stadium, Wellington		Cary Elwes (The Princess Bride), Summer Glau (Firefly), Hale Appleman (The Magicians), Graham McTavish (House of the Dragon), Liam McIntyre (Spartacus), Evan Evagora (Star Trek: Picard)	Veronica Taylor (Pokémon), Leah Clark (My Hero Academia), Austin Tindle (Tokyo Ghoul)	CutiePieSensei, SpicyThaiDesign	
10–11 December 2022	Te Pae Christchurch Convention Center, Christchurch		Vico Ortiz (Our Flag Means Death), Summer Glau (Firefly), Hale Appleman (The Magicians), Graham McTavish (House of the Dragon), Liam McIntyre (Spartacus), Evan Evagora (Star Trek: Picard)	Veronica Taylor (Pokémon), Leah Clark (My Hero Academia), Austin Tindle (Tokyo Ghoul)	CutiePieSensei	
25–26 March 2023	Baypark Arena, Tauranga		Jamie Campbell Bower (Stranger Things), Amie Donald (M3GAN, Sweet Tooth), Brian Beacock (Digimon Tamers, Bleach)			
3–5 June 2023	Auckland Showgrounds, Auckland		Michelle Gomez, Sacha Dhawan (Doctor Who), Caity Lotz (Legends of Tomorrow), Jack Gleeson (Game of Thrones), John Noble (LOTR, Fringe), David Anders, Emilie de Ravin, Georgina Haig (Once Upon A Time), Clive Standen, Lucy Martin (Vikings), Afshan Azad (Harry Potter)	Landon McDonald (Demon Slayer), Nicolas Roye, Justine Huxley (Apex Legends)	SpicyThaiDesign	
5–6 August 2023	Fly Palmy Arena, Palmerston North			Aaron Dismuke (Fullmetal Alchemist), Sarah Wiedenheft (Chainsaw Man), Katelyn Barr (My Hero Academia)		
20–23 October 2023	Auckland Showgrounds, Auckland		Kate Mulgrew, Robert Picardo (Star Trek: Voyager), Melissa Navia, Jess Bush (Star Trek: Strange New Worlds), Todd Stashwick (Star Trek: Pircard), Troy Baker (The Last of Us), Katy O'Brian, Omid Abtahi, Brendan Wayne (The Mandalorian), Brian Krause (Charmed), Ross Marquand (Avengers, The Walking Dead)	Austin Tindle (Tokyo Ghoul), Jason Spisak (Arcane), Derick Snow (Fire Force), Anairis Quiñones (My Hero Academia), A.J. Beckles (Tokyo Revengers)	Danielle DeNicola, WitchyBrew, Morgan Le Foy, SpicyThaiDesign	The Hillywood Show
24–25 February 2024	Dorothy Winstone Center, Auckland Girls' Grammar School, Auckland (24th) and The Opera House, Te Aro, Wellington (25th) The Lord of Time	Christopher Eccleston, Wendy Padbury, Caitlin Blackwood				
16–17 March 2024	Baypark Arena, Tauranga		David Hewlett, David Nykl (Stargate Atlantis), Gigi Edgley (Farscape), Spencer Wilding (Rogue One)	Zach Aguilar (Demon Slayer), Daman Mills (Dragon Ball Z)		Takayoshi Tanimoto
6–7 April 2024	Sky Stadium, Wellington	John Layman (CHEW), Ron Marz (Green Lantern)	Catherine Tate (Doctor Who), Holly Marie Combs (Charmed), John Noble (Fringe, Lord of the Rings), Joe Flanigan (Stargate Atlantis), Clive Standen, Lucy Martin (Vikings)	Abby Trott (Demon Slayer), Caitlin Glass (My Hero Academia)		
13–14 April 2024	Te Pae Christchurch Convention Centre	John Layman (CHEW), Ron Marz (Green Lantern)	Catherine Tate (Doctor Who), Holly Marie Combs (Charmed), John Noble (Fringe, Lord of the Rings), Joe Flanigan (Stargate Atlantis), Clive Standen, Lucy Martin (Vikings)	Abby Trott (Demon Slayer), Caitlin Glass (My Hero Academia)		
15–16 June 2024	Auckland Showgrounds, Auckland	Dean Rankine, Joshua Sky	Robert Patrick, John Barrowman, Tiya Sircar, Luke Baines, Temuera Morrison	Doug Cockle, Ian Cardoni, Harry Belden, Spencer Grammer, Bryce Papenbrook, Veronica Taylor, Matthew Waterson, Christina Kelly, Ryan Bartley	Hench & Scrap Foundry, Stella Chu	Sayaka Sasaki, Viva La Dirt League
3–4 August 2024	Fly Palmy Arena, Palmerston North	Ivanna Sakhno, Austin Tindle, Faye Mata				
25–28 October 2024	Auckland Showgrounds, Auckland	Jason Keith, Stephen B Jones	Jason Momoa (Aquaman), Danielle Panabaker (The Flash), Steven John Ward (One Piece), Craig Parker (Lord of the Rings), Grace Currey (Shazam!), Brenton Thwaites, Joshua Orpin (Titans), Lee Majdoub, Luisa D'Oliveira (The 100), Rachel Luttrell (Stargate Atlantis), Yvonne Chapman (Avatar: The Last Airbender), Patricia Tallman (Babylon 5), Lauren Mary Kim (Star Wars: The Clone Wars)	John Gremillion (One Piece), David McCormack (Bluey), Lenore Zann (X-Men), Kari Wahlgren (Rick & Morty), Caitlin Glass (My Hero Academia)		
5–6 April 2025	Te Pae Christchurch Convention Centre		Tyler Hoechlin (Superman & Lois), Jason Behr, Brendan Fehr, Nick Wechsler, Majandra Delfino (Roswell), Michelle Ang (Star Wars: The Bad Batch), Neil Fanning (Scooby-Doo), Matthew Waterhouse (Doctor Who), Mike Quinn (Star Wars)	Sarah Natochenny (Pokemon), Ryan Colt Levy (Chainsaw Man), Neil Kaplan (Naruto)		
18–20 April 2025	Sky Stadium, Wellington		Ron Perlman, Doug Jones (Hellboy), Jason Behr, Brendan Fehr, Nick Wechsler, Majandra Delfino (Roswell), Neil Fanning (Scooby-Doo), Mike Quinn (Star Wars)	Roger Craig Smith (Sonic), Patricia Summersett (Breath of the Wild), Sarah Natochenny (Pokemon), Cristina Vee (Helluva Boss)		
31 May-2 June 2025	Auckland Showgrounds, Auckland		Ioan Gruffudd, T. J. Thyne, Renee O'Connor, Jeff Ward, Kim Rhodes, Neil Fanning	Pete Capella, Reagan Murdock, Natal van Sistine, Jason Douglas	Alyson Tabbitha, Rachel Maksy, Riki LeCotey, Vera Chimera, Amy Parris, Daniel Selon	
2–3 August 2025	Fly Palmy Arena, Palmerston North	Miranda Otto, Colleen O'Shaughnessey, Jason Griffith				
24–27 October 2025	Auckland Showgrounds, Auckland	Charles Soule	Elijah Wood, Andy Serkis, Billie Piper, John Boyega, Alan Tudyk, Evangeline Lilly, Alex Garfin, Diana Lee Inosanto	Jim Cummings, Michelle Ang, Damien Haas, David Sobolov, Mick Wingert, Veronica Taylor, Mallorie Rodak, Ricco Fajaardo		Nolan North, Johnny Young, Mela Lee, Justine Huxley, Nicolas Roye
21–22 March 2026	Te Pae Christchurch Convention Center, Christchurch	TBA				
3–5 April 2026	Sky Stadium, Wellington	TBA				
25–27 April 2026	Auckland Showgrounds, Auckland	TBA				
1–2 August 2026	Fly Palmy Arena, Palmerston North	TBA				
23–26 October 2026	Auckland Showgrounds, Auckland	TBA				

== Spinoff ventures ==
=== New Zealand Comic Con ===
From 2015 to 2017, Armageddon also operated the New Zealand Comic Con in Wellington. Events included:

- A 3-day Scavenger Hunt
- Pub Crawls
- Quiz nights
- Art exhibitions
- A house of horrors
- Cosplay photoshoots
- Opening and closing parties.

The New Zealand Comic Con attracted nearly 25,000 guests, and was last held in 2017.

=== NZ Anime Convention ===
The NZ Anime Convention (also known as the Dunedin Anime Experience) was a commercial anime and manga convention held in Dunedin, New Zealand. It was first held in 2009 in a growing response to include Dunedin into the Armageddon Expo family. The first event was held in the Dunedin Town Hall and from 2010 onwards at Castle Lecture Complex in the University of Otago. This event ceased after two years and was replaced by the Armageddon Expo Dunedin Show in 2012.
