= Anime South =

Anime convention

- Status: Defunct
- Venue: Hampton Inn Pensacola Beach
- Location: Pensacola, Florida
- Country: United States
- Inaugurated: 2005
- Most recent: 2013
- Attendance: 972 in 2009

Anime South was a three-day anime convention held in the city of Pensacola, Florida. The convention also has the distinction of being the first anime convention to garner its seed money from a small number of contributors who desired an anime convention in the area.

== Programming ==
Anime South hosted many events common to other anime conventions, such as anime screenings, panels and workshops, game shows, dealers room, artist alley, video game room, dance, and cosplay events.

== History ==
Anime South was created by one of the co-founders of Anime USA. Planning took place over a two-month period, after which the largest luxury hotel in the region, The Hilton Sandestin Beach Golf Resort & Spa, was contracted for November 18–20, 2005. The 2015 event was cancelled due to financial issues.

=== Event history ===
Dates	Location	Atten.	Guests
November 18–20, 2005	Hilton Sandestin Beach Golf Resort & Spa; Destin, Florida	463	Lauren Goodnight, Maboroshi, Marc Matney, and Mirana Reveier.
November 3–5, 2006	Hilton Sandestin Beach Golf Resort & Spa; Destin, Florida		Ashley Clark, Richard Epcar, Chris Hazelton, Vic Mignogna, The Mindless Tripod Experience, and Ellyn Stern.
December 28–30, 2007	Hilton Sandestin Beach Golf Resort & Spa; Destin, Florida	1,210	Steve Bennett, Ashley Clark, Richard Epcar, Lisa Furukawa, Yaya Han, Doug Smith, Spike Spencer, and Ellyn Stern.
January 2–4, 2009	Hilton Sandestin Beach Golf Resort & Spa; Destin, Florida	972	AniRage, Ashley Clark, C.J. Collins, Richard Epcar, Vic Mignogna, Meredith Placko, Ellyn Stern, and Carolann Voltarel.
December 18–20, 2009	Hilton Sandestin Beach Golf Resort & Spa; Destin, Florida		Johnny Yong Bosch, Eyeshine, Maja, Meredith Placko, and Patrick Seitz.
December 27–29, 2013	Hampton Inn Pensacola Beach; Pensacola Beach, Florida		Anna Fischer, Katie George, Riki "Riddle" LeCotey, Monika Lee, Lindze Merritt, Jessica Nigri, and Carolann Voltarel.
