= Monika Lee =

American cosplayer (born 1992)

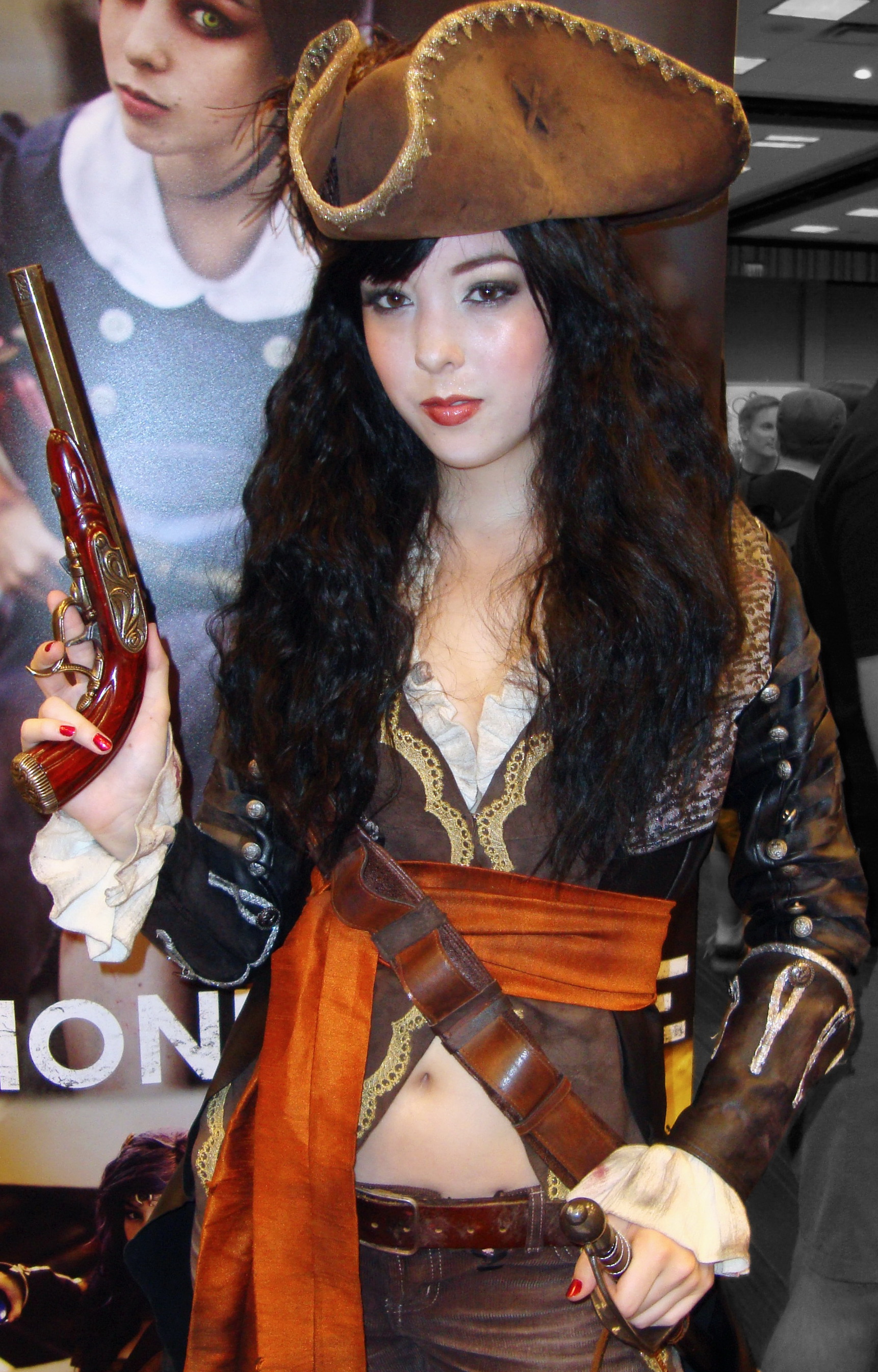
- Monika Lee at Dragon Con 2013
- Born: December 7, 1992 (age 33); Atlanta, Georgia, U.S.
- Modeling information
- Height: 5 ft 9 in (175 cm)
- Hair color: Brown
- Eye color: Brown
- Website: Official website

Monika Lee (born December 7, 1992) is an American cosplayer. In 2013, she joined the cast of reality television show Heroes of Cosplay.

== Biography ==
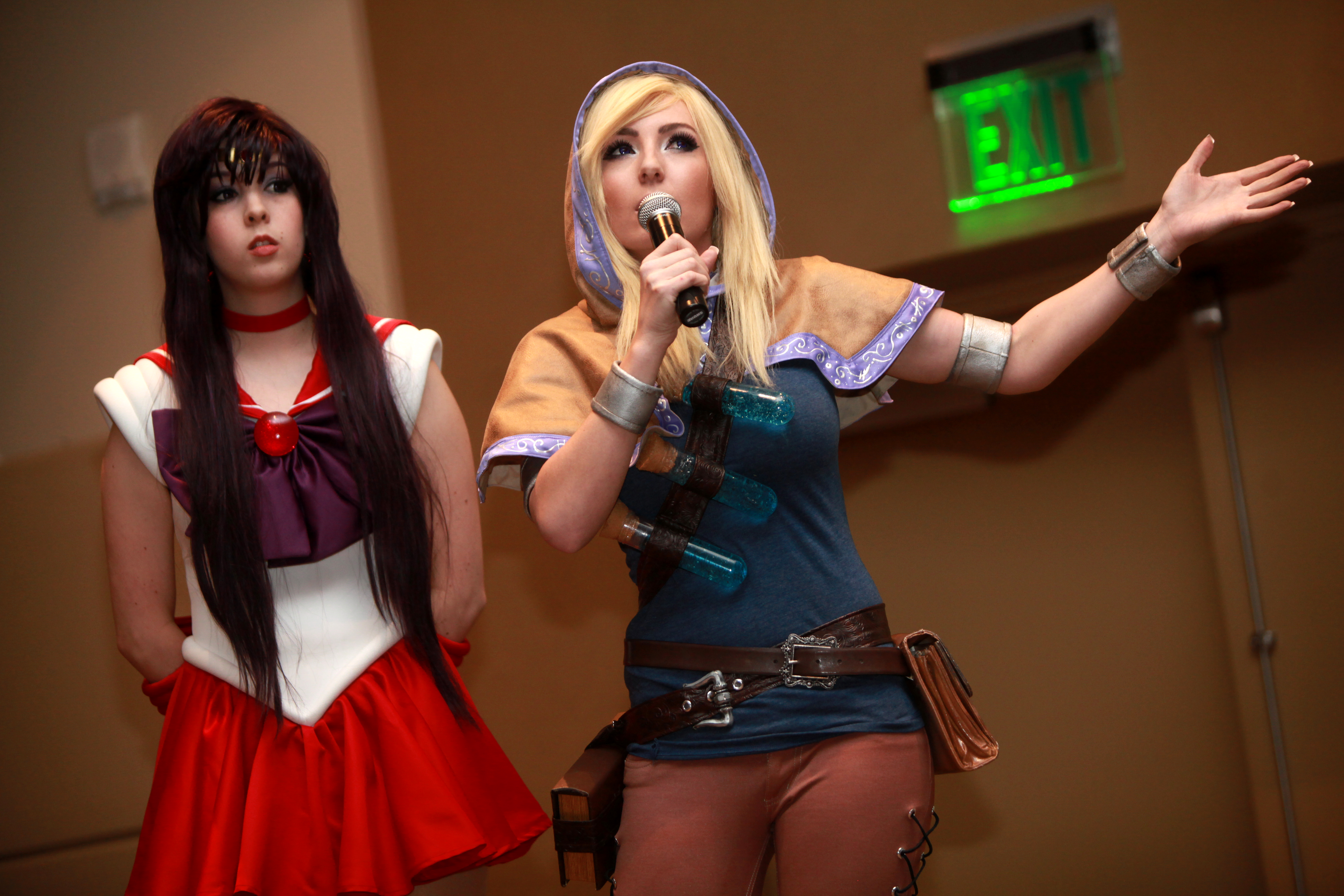
Monika Lee dressed as Sailor Mars (left), co-hosting a costume contest with Jessica Nigri (right) at the 2014 Amazing Arizona Comic Con

Lee has been cosplaying anime and especially video game characters since 2006, when she dressed as Yuna at the age of 13, and is a frequent collaborator with the cosplayer Jessica Nigri in the XX Girls group. She has been acclaimed and featured by gaming media outlets such as Game Informer and GamesRadar, as well as showcased in various other publications. Lee worked as a cosplay model at E3 2012 for Hyperkin, at E3 2013 and San Diego Comic-Con in 2013 for Blizzard Entertainment, and at PAX East 2014 for Carbine Studios and NC Soft. She was invited as a guest or host at multiple fan conventions, including Amazing Arizona Comic Con, Anime South, FantasyCon, MomoCon, Montreal Comiccon, Ottawa Pop Expo, and Pensacon.

Lee is a Milton High School graduate and was the youngest of the Heroes of Cosplay show's original cast of nine. As of 2013, she has been studying industrial design at the Georgia Institute of Technology, whose website claimed "she has an online fan base twice the size of the student population," and was working as an intern for the licensing and business development team at Blizzard Entertainment.

== See also ==
- List of cosplayers
