= Kevin McGuire =

Australian rules footballer

Personal information
- Full name: Kevin McGuire
- Born: 10 June 1961 (age 65)
- Original team: Westmeadows
- Height: 185 cm (6 ft 1 in)
- Weight: 81 kg (179 lb)
- Position: Defence

Playing career^{1}
Years	Club	Games (Goals)
1981–85	North Melbourne	18 (1)
- ^{1} Playing statistics correct to the end of 1985.

Kevin McGuire (born 10 June 1961) is a former Australian rules footballer who played with North Melbourne in the Victorian Football League (VFL).
