= Jessica Nigri =

American-New Zealand cosplayer (born 1989)

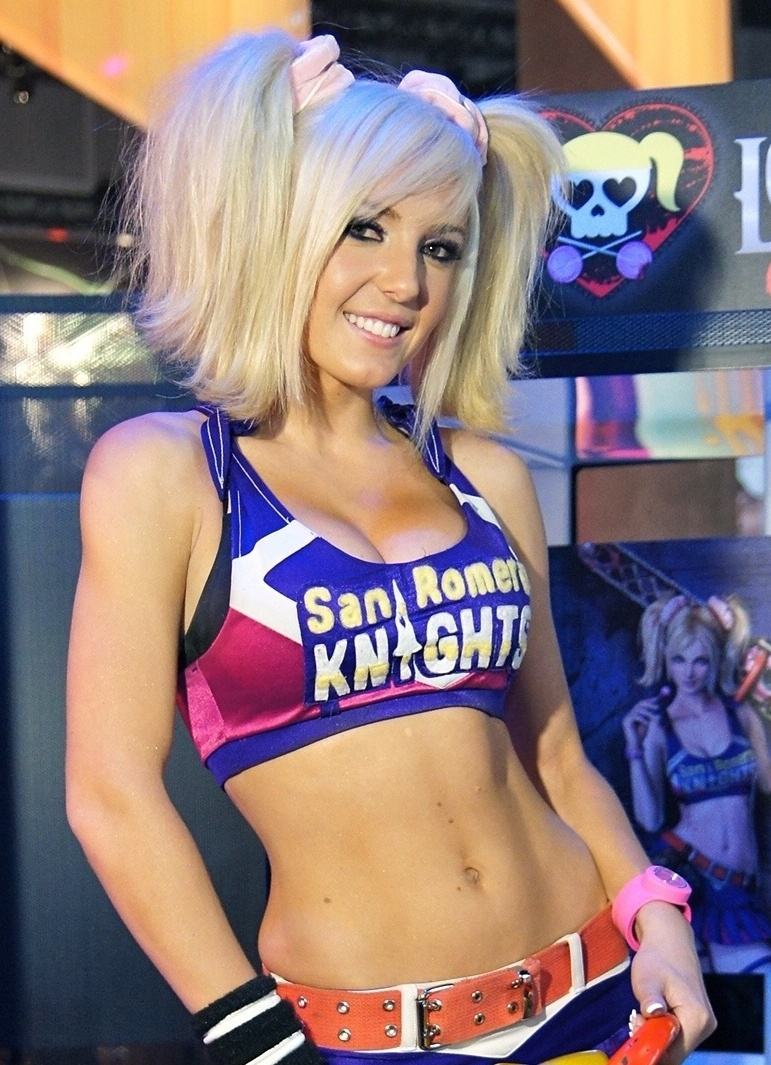
- Nigri cosplaying as Lollipop Chainsaw's Juliet Starling during the game's marketing campaign in 2012
- Born: August 5, 1989 (age 37); Reno, Nevada, U.S
- Occupations: Cosplay celebrity, spokesmodel, YouTuber, voice actress
- Years active: 2009–present (cosplaying); 2012–present (modeling)

Jessica Nigri (born August 5, 1989) is an American-New Zealander cosplayer, promotional and glamour model, YouTuber, voice actress, and fan convention interview correspondent. She has been cosplaying since 2009 and modeling since 2012, having served as an official spokesmodel for several video games and comic book series, including Lollipop Chainsaw and Assassin's Creed IV: Black Flag. She is also notable for her voice work as Cinder Fall in RWBY.

== Early life ==
Jessica Nigri was born in Reno, Nevada, United States and grew up in Christchurch, New Zealand, which is her mother's homeland. She later moved to Arizona. Nigri has been cosplaying since 2009, when her cosplay of "Sexy Pikachu" that she wore to San Diego Comic-Con went viral on the Internet. In 2011, she promoted Gears of War 3 for Microsoft and GameStop, dressed up as the game's character Anya Stroud for the game's release.

== Career ==
In 2012, Nigri won IGN's contest for a model to portray Juliet Starling, protagonist of Suda51's video game Lollipop Chainsaw and was hired as a spokesmodel by Warner Bros. Games. When she appeared as Juliet at the 2012 Penny Arcade Expo (PAX) East, convention officials, having received complaints that the pink outfit she was wearing was too revealing, asked her to either change or step off the floor and restrict her presence; Nigri changed into Juliet Starling's regular costume, but it was deemed too revealing as well and she was asked to leave. As part of the deal, Kadokawa Games brought her on Lollipop Chainsaw to Japan to attend Akihabara and tour Japanese video game magazines and websites, including Famitsu and Dengeki. That same year, Nigri signed up to promote or represent several other works, including Kill3rCombo's video game Elsword and comic book series Grimm Fairy Tales (for Zenescope Entertainment) and Knightingail (by Crucidel Productions).

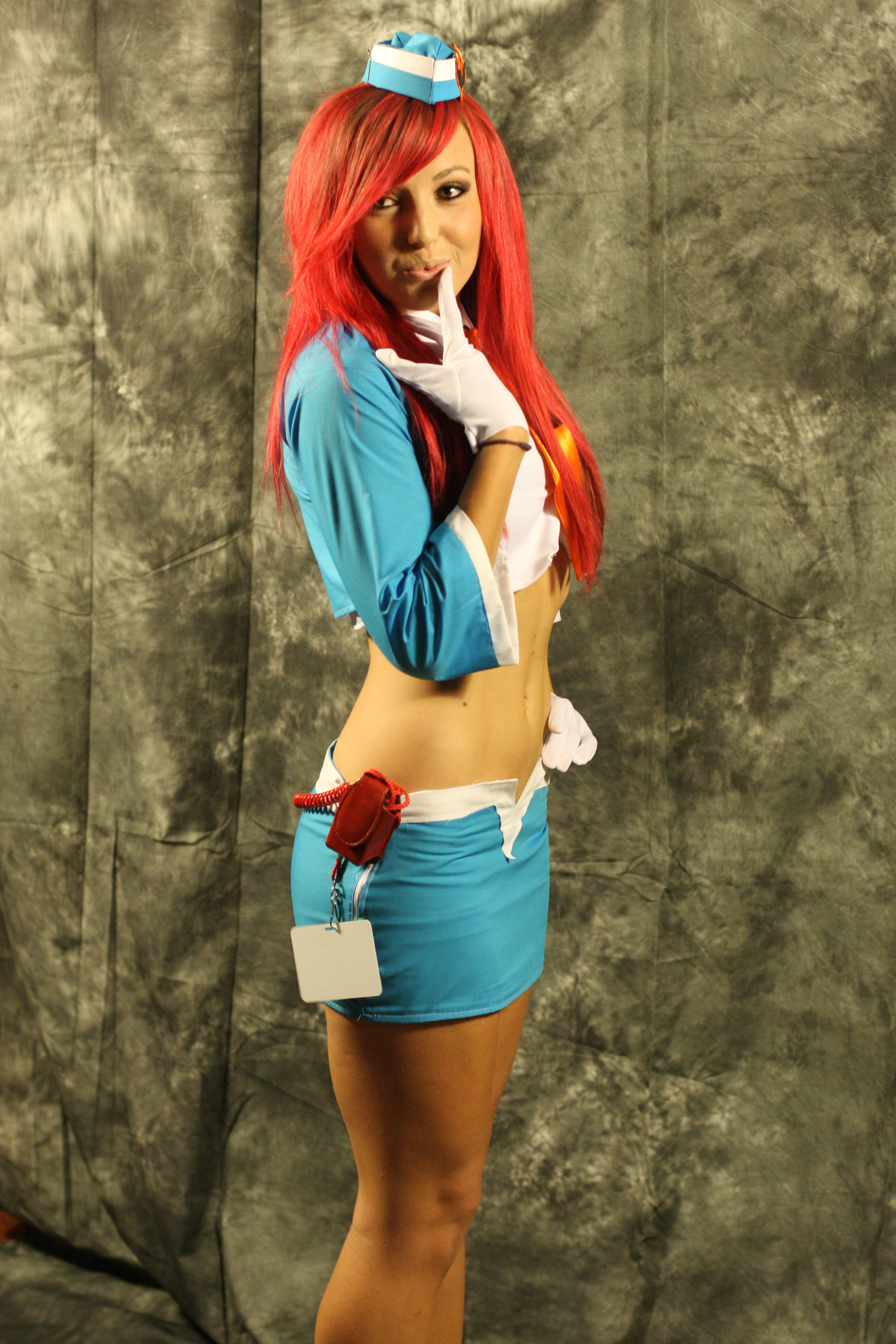
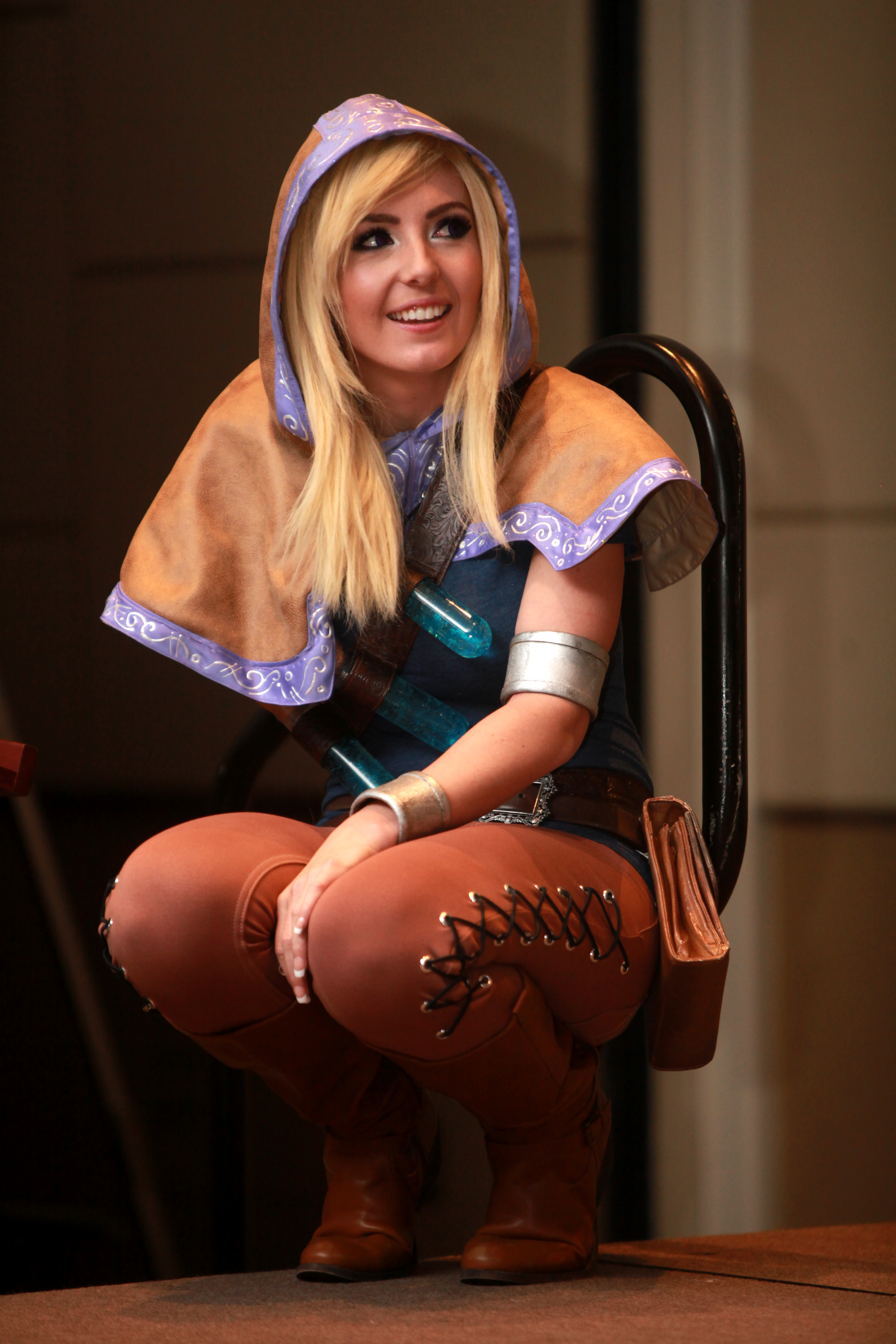
Cosplay as Gurren Lagann's Yoko Littner at Saboten Con 2009 (left) and League of Legends' Lux at the 2014 Amazing Arizona Comic Con (right)

Nigri was hired to be a spokesmodel for Amazing Arizona Comic Con 2011, was invited to multiple conventions including Anime Expo 2012, Anime Revolution 2012 (including appearing as the convention mascot Senkaku Mei) and 2013, AVCon 2013, Montreal Comiccon 2013, Anime South 2013 and Ottawa Pop Expo, as a guest of honor. She was featured on YouTube channels and shows such as KassemG and The Philip DeFranco Show and in a unique card in the downloadable trading card game Z.

In 2013, Nigri was again approached by Suda51 to portray the character Vivienne Squall from Grasshopper Manufacture's new video game Killer Is Dead, to which she accepted. That same year, after cosplaying the character Connor Kenway from Assassin's Creed III, she was hired by Ubisoft to portray a female version of Captain Edward Kenway, the protagonist of video game Assassin's Creed IV: Black Flag at Gamescom 2013. At E3 2013, she portrayed both Vivienne Squall and Edward Kenway; she also represented Tecmo Koei's video game Yaiba: Ninja Gaiden Z, portraying the character Miss Monday at PAX 2013. In 2014, she cosplayed at Carbine Studios' WildStar PAX East booth.

Nigri has worked as an interviewer for media outlets such as GameZone, RUGGED TV and Comic Book Therapy. She also starred in several commercial video advertisements and music videos and did charity work. Aside from appearing on the PDS in the past, Nigri is a friend of DeFranco, including having her merchandise hosted in his store ForHumanPeoples, Nigri opened her own online poster store, named Nigri please! According to PlayStation Official Magazine, Nigri is "not just a cosplayer but also a massive gamer"; she says she has played video games since her early childhood, starting at an age of seven and having been first exposed to them by her father.

Nigri has been active as a member of the cosplay group XX Girls and Kat Gunn's professional gaming and cosplay team, Less Than 3 (LT3), sponsored by Mad Catz. Nigri has also worked with theCHIVE. For some time, a particular interest of Nigri has been to dress up as "genderbending" female versions of various male characters. After Nigri reportedly declined to appear on the controversial 2013 reality show Heroes of Cosplay, the Syfy network's producers manufactured what appeared to be a fierce rivalry and dislike between her and the show's star Yaya Han in order to make the series look more dramatic; the two later appeared together to explain they are actually friends in real life and the show is not necessarily an accurate representation of cosplay subculture. Nigri said she plans to eventually retire from modeling and to study and pursue a career in the "behind the scenes" aspects of marketing and advertising.

In 2018, Nigri was the subject of Becoming Jessica Nigri, a documentary produced by Rooster Teeth and directed by Mat Hames.

== Filmography ==
=== Film and television ===
Documentary
Year	Title	Role	Source
2018	Becoming Jessica Nigri	Jessica Nigri	

List of voice performances in film and television
Year	Title	Role	Notes	Source
2013–present	RWBY	Cinder Fall		
2014	Red vs. Blue	Simmons' Lieutenant	Episodes "Oh Captains, My Captains" and "Something Else Entirely"	
2015	Super Sonico: The Animation	Sonico		
2016–2018; 2021	RWBY Chibi	Cinder Fall		

=== Commercials ===
Year	Title	Role	Source
2012	Zom-Be-Gone	Juliet Starling (Lollipop Chainsaw)	
2012	Buzzzzzz Kill	Juliet Starling (Lollipop Chainsaw)	
2013	KID TV	Vivienne Squall (Killer Is Dead)	

=== Music videos ===
Year	Title	Role	Source
2011	Chalkskin: T 'n A	Cosplay girl	
2012	Nigri Please!	Sonya Blade (Mortal Kombat)	

=== Video games ===
Year	Title	Role	Source
2014	Smite	Cinder Fall	
2016	Sonicomi: Communication with Sonico	Sonico	
