= Heroes of Cosplay =

American TV show

- Starring: See below
- Narrated by: Mike Bratton
- Composers: David Vanacore (Vanacore Music)
- Country of origin: United States
- Original language: English
- No. of seasons: 2
- No. of episodes: 12

Production
- Executive producers: Lauren Brady; Dave Caplan; Mark Cronin
- Producers: Tanya McRae; Summer Oakley; Kate Aquillano
- Cinematography: Steve Russell; Mike L. Taylor; Dan Farnam
- Editors: John Babinec; Phil Habeger; Raiko Siems
- Production company: 51 Minds Entertainment

Original release
- Network: Syfy
- Release: August 2013 – 2014

Heroes of Cosplay is a 2013 Syfy channel reality television show co-produced by Mark Cronin, Courtland Cox and Dave Caplan of 51 Minds Entertainment. The show's first season's six episodes follows nine cast members as they compete in cosplay events at various conventions across the United States, attending Wizard World Portland, Emerald City Comicon, MegaCon, Anime Matsuri and Planet Comicon. The series was renewed for a continued season 1 (officially "Season 1.5") in 2014, with a few new additions to the cast and will primarily be set in Los Angeles and Atlanta areas. The second season, billed as "season 1.5", features events outside the United States: Arte Cosplay 2 in Buenos Aires, Argentina (episode 7) and Ottawa Pop Expo in Ottawa, Ontario, Canada (episode 8).

== Cast ==
	Season 1	Season 1.5
Chloe Dykstra	✓	✓
Holly Conrad (Commander Holly)	✓	✓
Jesse Lagers	✓	✓
Jessica Merizan	✓	✓
Riki LeCotey	✓	✓
Yaya Han	✓	✓
Becky Young (Aktrez)	✓	
Monika Lee	✓	
Victoria Schmidt (Scruffy Rebel)	✓	
Carl Martin		✓
Indra Rojas (FantasyNinja)		✓
Katie George		✓
Meg Turney		✓
Miguel Guifarro (MiggyJagger)		✓

== Reception ==
Heroes of Cosplay was criticized by some for allegedly grossly misrepresenting cosplay, humiliating and frustrating the cosplayers who were not part of the show's cast but were attending competitions at the series' featured conventions, and hurting the community. According to Zac Bertschy of Anime News Network, the show is "just a really terrible, manipulative, mean-spirited reality TV series that completely misrepresents the entire hobby and craft of cosplaying, makes cosplayers look like a bunch of backstabbing harpies and generally does a disservice to the already widely-misunderstood world of people who just like making costumes and showing them off at silly nerd conventions." Syfy and its owner NBCUniversal Cable were also accused of having used photographs of cosplayers without the permission of the photographers, one of whom threatened to sue. The second half of the first season (1.5) had an overhaul of the presentation formatting for the show with more emphasis on the crafting, group work, skit competitions and less manufactured drama.

Despite the controversies surrounding it, the first season achieved solid Nielsen ratings, being watched by some 1 million viewers, and a mostly positive Metacritic score of 66. Jeff Jensen of Entertainment Weekly gave it a B+ and Allison Keene of The Hollywood Reporter called it "a worthy journey into a world few may be familiar with." The New York Post writer Linda Stasi gave the show 3 out of 4 stars but questioned whether cosplayers are "confused;" Stasi's article upset some readers.

== See also ==
- Cosplay Melee
