= The Red Star =

Comic book series

- Cover of The Red Star, issue #1, German edition

Publication information
- Publisher: Image Comics
- Format: Ongoing
- Genre: Science fantasy, alternate history
- Publication date: 2001 - 2008

Creative team
- Created by: Christian Gossett
- Written by: Christian Gossett; Bradley Kayl; Jennifer Quintenz; Jhennifer Webberley
- Artist(s): Allen Coulter; Jon Moberly; Junki Saita; Komputer Graphics Bureau; Snakebite
- Colorist: Wētā Workshop Design Team
- Editor: Johanna Olson

The Red Star is a comic book series created by American artist Christian Gossett and a large team, and first published by Image Comics in 2001. It was one of the first computer-generated comics, making heavy use of line-art from 3D models to present large cinematic scenes suited to its expansive sci-fi/fantasy world. This world is described by Gossett as a "Mythic [Soviet] Russia", the "Lands of The Red Star" being inspired by both Russian folklore and military history. The series is thus heavily reminiscent of a post-World War II Soviet Union, mixing technology and sorcery, in a blend known within the lore as "Military Industrial Sorcery".

== Development and predecessor works ==
Christian Gossett began his career in 1988 on Tales of the Ninja Warriors for CFW publishing. CFW, a Martial Arts supply distributor, received a pitch from Bradley "Peter" Parker, a comics artist and writer. The pitch was to publish a black and white comics anthology, in which their martial arts catalogue could be advertised. The late 80's black and white boom being in full swing, CFW greenlit the anthology, including Tales of the Ninja Warriors. Only nineteen years old when he was hired, and with no previous professional comics experience, Gossett was tasked with creating, writing, drawing, inking and lettering his pages every month.

From there, thanks to the recommendation of his friend Frank Gomez, Gossett was hired by Dark Horse Comics to pencil the first two issues of Star Wars: Tales of the Jedi. A lifelong Star Wars fan like most of his generation, Gossett threw himself into the role. Gossett's innovative designs and romantic imagery would keep him for several more Star Wars stories. His work on Star Wars brought him a lot of experience to create his own independent project, resulting in writing a comic book named The Red Star.

== Comics ==
=== Volume 1: The Battle of Kar Dathras Gate – #1–4 ===
The first four issues of The Red Star tell the story of the war of the state and the Red Fleet / Army against Al'Istaan, told in a retrospective by Maya Antares, who remembers her husband's death in that war. Having penetrated deeply into Al'Nistaani, the fleet of Red Star skyfurnaces, gigantic flying warships up to three kilometres long, seem to destroy their enemies when the volcanic fury of their engines is directed on the massed enemies below. An ancient protector of the Nistaani, Kar Dathra the Immortal, appears, and powered by the mystical energies of his thousands of dying followers manages to destroy almost the whole of the Red Fleet.

The further three of the first four issues deal mainly with the panicked attempt of Maya to reach her husband, fighting a grim and hopeless infantry battle on the ground where suddenly, the might of the Red Fleet crashes down and burns, turning certain victory into history-changing defeat. The deaths and the spiritual energies released by the dying soldiers waken other mystical beings, whose goals and allegiances are still not fully known in the first issues. Their apparent warring over the dead souls, especially that of Marcus Antares, become a major plot of the later issues.

Marcus himself is saved by the appearance of a mysterious ghost known only as the Red Woman. She saves his soul from becoming a captive of the evil sorcerer Troika, who is the servant of the evil Imbohl. Defeating Troika in a duel, the Red Woman spirits Marcus away into the Spiritrealm, informing him that "it was not our people who were defeated here, but our past-- and the path to our future begins with you".

=== Volume 2: Nokgorka – #5–9 ===
Issue #5 tells the story of the Fall of the Red Fleet from the perspective of the Prison Laborers whose grim toil maintains the massive Skyfurnaces.

Subsequent issues chronicle the further adventures of Maya and Marcus, who lives on in the spirit realm, working from within to undo the tyranny of Imbohl's legacy. In issue #9, Maya is contacted by The Red Woman, who explains the source of the world's magical power and what Marcus has been doing since he went missing almost ten years earlier. The issue concludes with the crew of the skyfurnace R.S.S. Konstantinov, led by Maya's brother-in-law Urik Antares, mutinying and fighting their way to a transport gate.

=== Annual #1: Run Makita Run ===
This standalone issue was published by Archangel Studios in November 2002 as their first (and only) annual. This issue takes place between the events of Volume 1, issues #5 and #6. Makita has one hour to reach her father before he dies. Along the way she encounters and defeats a squad of red soldiers and a Hydra-class krawl. Her father entrusts her with a letter from Marcus to his wife Maya and charges her to complete his mission of delivering it to the sorceress.

=== Volume 3: Prison of Souls ===
Published by Archangel Studios/CG Entertainment Group, this series picks up exactly where the Image comic leaves off, with the crew of the Konstantinov fighting off the crew of the R.S.S. Taktarov which has followed them through the gate into the "Storm of Souls". By the end of issue five, Maya has gained the ability to see the souls within the storm and the Konstantinov begins to follow them to the invasion of Archangel: the Prison of Souls.

=== Volume 4: The Sword of Lies ===
The Red Star: Sword of Lies is the continuation of the comic series and continues the story from the previous trade paperback, Prison of Souls. The story also details the background to the fall of the summoner Imbohl during the Great Revolution. Once a leader of the Revolution, Imbohl's embrace of evil is the origin of The Red Star saga. This run is currently on issue #3, which premiered at Comicon International San Diego 2008.

This series is colored by the Wētā Workshop Design Team, known previously for their film work on The Lord of the Rings trilogy, King Kong, and The Chronicles of Narnia.

== Characters ==
- Marcus Antares is an Infantry Captain of the Red Fleet and the husband of Maya Antares.
- Maya Antares is a Warkaster (sorcerer and human energy cannon) of the Red Fleet and the wife of Marcus Antares.
- Urik Antares is the commanding officer of the Skyfurnace R.S.S. (Red Star Skyship) Marshall Konstantinov and the older brother of Marcus Antares.
- Kyuzo is a guardsman to Maya Antares and considered to be the deadliest of all the guardsman.
- Makita is an orphan of the War of Nokgorka and a member of the Nokgorka Resistance Militia.
- Alexandra Goncharova is Maya's oldest and best friend. She is killed in action in the Massacre of the 13* st armored division (War of Nokgorka).
- Andrei Torin is Chief Engineer of the R.S.S. Konstantinov and a powerful 'rogue' sorcerer.
- The Red Woman is the mysterious leader of the Forces of Liberation, seeking to free her people from their slavery to the legacy of Imbohl.
- Troika is a servant of Imbohl, leader of the national security agency known as the 'Third Department', seeking to maintain the order established by the rule of Imbohl.
- Imbohl is revered as the leader of the Great Revolution. Imbohl was a sorcerer who led the Red Councils to victory over the corrupt Monarchy of the Ancient Dynasties.
- Iakos is described by Goss as a "soul thief".

== Credits ==
=== 'Team Red Star' 1999–2004 ===
- Christian Gossett – creator and writer
- Bradley Kayl – co-writer
- Allen Coulter – 3D
- Jon Moberly – 3D
- Junki Saita and the Komputer Graphics Bureau – 3D
- Snakebite – co-art direction, design, special effects, digital paint and 2D/3D integration
- Johanna Olson – business manager/co-producer
- Nathaniel Downes – finance manager/co-producer
- Paul Schrier – 3D artist/development

=== 'Team Red Star' 2006–2008 ===
- Christian Gossett – creator and writer
- Wētā Workshop Design Team – colorists
- Paul Schrier, Emil Petrinic, Kostas Koutsoliotas – 3D team
- Jennifer Quintenz – co-writer
- Jhennifer Webberley – co-writer
- Johanna Olson – publisher/editor
- Nathaniel Downes – Archangel Studios

== In other media ==
=== On iPhone and Google Android ===
In March 2009, Team Red Star partnered with iVerse Comics, a digital comic company that produced digital long form comic books for the iPhone, iPod Touch and Google Android, to release an adaptation of The Red Star in digital media. Issues #1, #2 and #3 are currently available.

=== In video games ===
The Red Star video game began development at Acclaim Studios Austin in 2002. Work on the originally intended Xbox video game has been more or less completed, but it was never published due to Acclaim's bankruptcy. While the Xbox version never saw a commercial release, the game itself has been found on some peer-to-peer file-sharing networks, and a demo was available on a disc which shipped with the Official Xbox Magazine. The PlayStation 2 game rights were picked up by XS Games and was released on April 24, 2007. The OFLC of Australia, an agency similar to the ratings board ESRB in the United States, did in 2006 classify the game as "PG" for mild violence.

=== In roleplaying games ===
In 2004, Green Ronin published a supplement for the d20 Modern roleplaying game, covering rules for playing in the setting of the comic books. As well as rules, it contains much background material not found in the main storyline, fleshing out the characters and backstory more. It features internal art mainly taken directly from the comic, along with additional art from James Ryman.

=== Film ===
In the early 2010s, Warner Bros. was developing a film adaptation of The Red Star. Josh Trank, director of Chronicle, was attached to develop the project in 2012. No further updates on the project were provided following the initial announcement.
