= Dean Rankine =

Australian comics artist, writer and illustrator

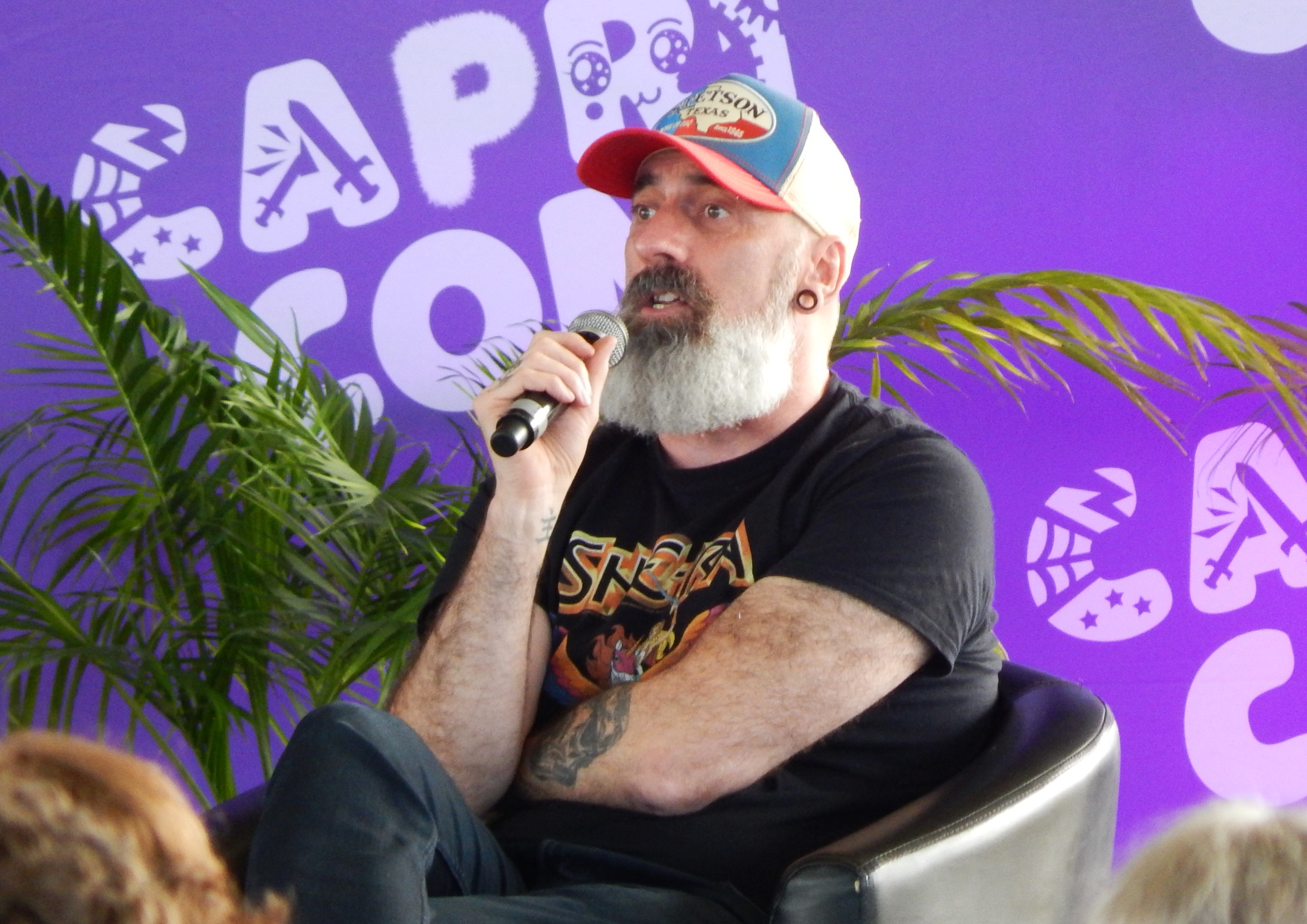
- Dean Rankine, 2022
- Occupation: comics artist
- Known for: Illustrating comics, books and magazines
- Notable work: Simpsons Comics, Futurama Comics

Dean Rankine is an Australian comics artist, writer, illustrator and painter on the ABC's, 'Portrait Artist of the Year'. Rankine's work has appeared in many comics, books and magazines.

== Career ==
His early comics appeared in many children's magazines - Mania, Explore, Krash, KidZone and Challenge. His own characters have included "Grossgirl and Boogerboy" in Mania and "In the Wild With Maggie and Mitch" in Explore (Pearson Education). He became a Dandy artist in issue 3571 and has drawn the mini-strips 'My Mum Is A Brain Eating Zombie', 'Flatman and Ribbon', 'The Shrimpsons', 'Simon's Bowel' and 'Teenage Mutant Ninja Turkeys' for that title. Rankine is a regular guest and presenter at Australian Comic Conventions.

He has gone on to work on Simpsons Comics. His other credits include Futurama, Rick and Morty, Invader Zim, Underdog, Oggy and the Cockroaches and The Riverdale Diaries: Starring Veronica. He illustrated the Timmy the Ticked-Off Pony series - written by Magda Szubanski. And wrote and illustrated - Death Metal Emo Elves.

== Credits ==
Over the past 20 years, his credits include Simpsons and Futurama comics (Bongo), Rick and Morty (Oni) Australian MAD Magazine, Hellboy (Dark Horse), Skottie Young's I Hate Fairyland (Image), the iconic Dandy and Beano magazines (DC Thomson), Itty Bitty Bunnies in Rainbow Pixie Candy Land (Action Lab Entertainment). He has also illustrated books for Scholastic (including A Funny Thing Happened to Simon Sidebottom), Pearson Australia and Penguin Books (The Stuff Happens series).

Beginning in 2001, Rankine's Simpsons and Bart Simpsons Comics (Bongo) contributions include:

- Simpsons Comics #180, #182, #183, #184, #186, #200, #211, #225, #228,
- Futurama Comics #62,
- Bongo's Two One-Shot Wonders in One #1,
- Bart Simpson's Pal, Milhouse #1
- Simpsons Winter Wingding #7, #10,
- Bongo Comics Free-For-All 2013 & 2014
- The Malevolent Mr. Burns #1
- Bart Simpson Comics #78, #80, #82, #83, #87, #89, #91, #94, #95, #98, #99
- The Greatest Bartman Stories Ever Told #1 and
- Jimbo Jones #1.

Other Matt Groening Productions include Bartman: The Superhero's Handbook (Vault of Simpsonology) and Bartman Trading Cards.

His other credits include Futurama (Bongo) Hellboy Winter Special 2016 #1 (Dark Horse Comics), I Hate Fairyland #13 (Image Comics) and 'Itty Bitty Bunnies in Rainbow Pixie Candy Land' #1, #2, #3, #4, #5, #6 and Itty Bitty Bunnies: Cavalcade of Contraband (TPB) and Friendgasm (TPB) (Action Lab Entertainment), The 'Stuff Happens' series (Penguin Books), Australian MAD Magazine (Next Media) and Oggy and the Cockroaches (American Mythology Productions). Rankine authored the webcomic Holy Cow! Christian Comics, which he hosted on Webcomics Nation, as well as The Unbelievable Unfortunately Mostly Unreadable and Nearly Unpublishable Untold Tales of I Hate Fairyland.

== Awards ==
In 2015, he received a Ledger Award for Itty Bitty Bunnies: Save X-mas, recognising excellence in Australian Comics.

In 2020 he received the Stan Cross Award in Book Illustration from the Australian Cartoonists' Association (ACA).

In 2024 the Australian Cartoonists Association awarded him with two Stan Cross Awards; Comic Book Artist and Book Illustrator.

In 2025 he was a finalist on the Australian version of, 'Portrait Artist of the Year' on the ABC.

In 2026 he was a finalist for ‘Cartoonist of the Year’ and winner of the Stan Cross Award for ‘Book Illustrator’ from the Australian Cartoonists Association.
