= Yaya Han =

American cosplayer, model and costume designer

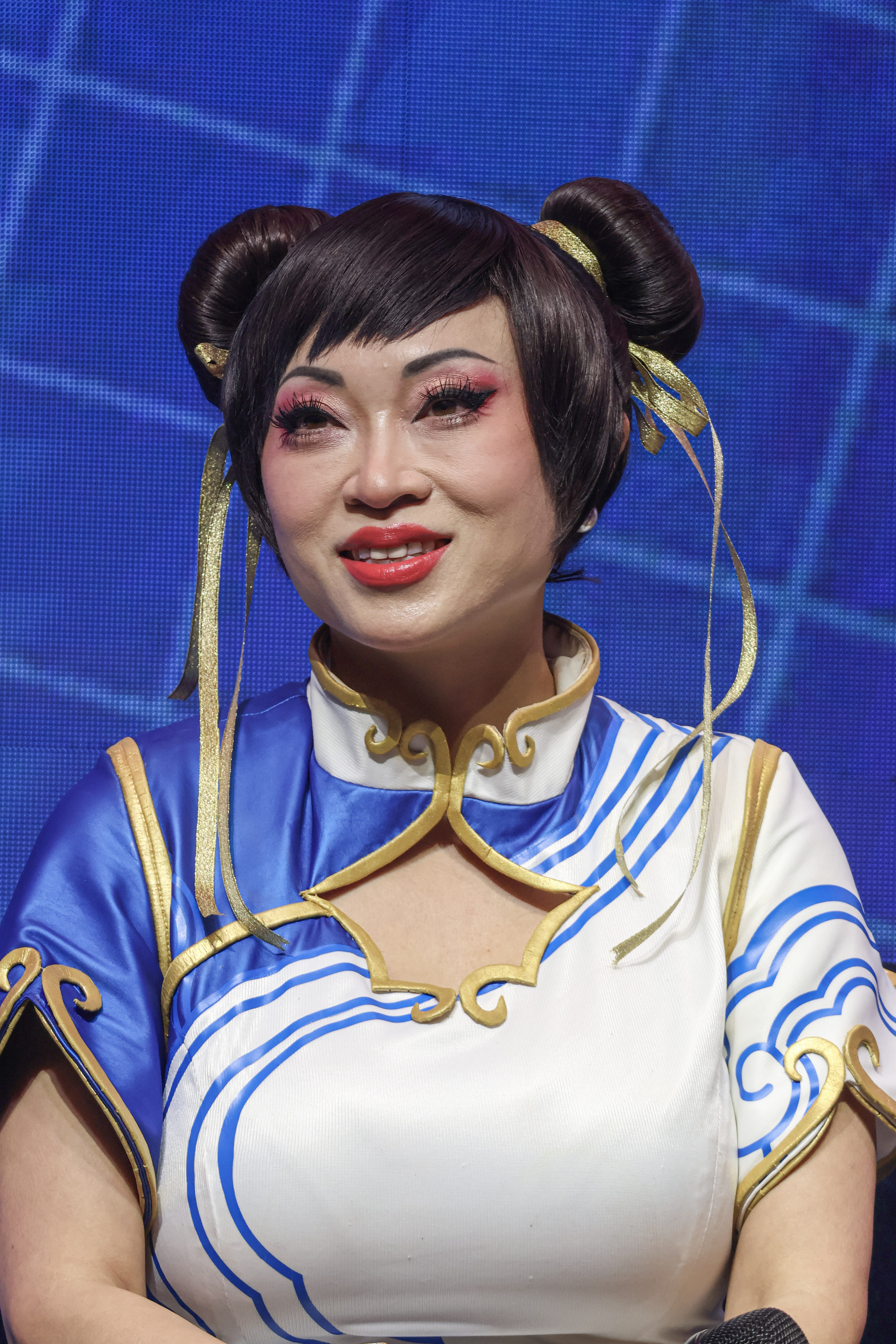
- Yaya Han at Comic Con Cape Town 2026
- Born: April 10, 1980 (age 46); Xian, China
- Citizenship: American
- Occupations: Cosplayer, model and costume designer
- Modeling information
- Height: 5 ft 1 in (155 cm)
- Hair color: Black
- Eye color: Light brown
- Website: www.yayahan.com

Yaya Han (born April 10, 1980), is a Chinese–American cosplayer, model and costume designer based in the United States. She is a regular judge at cosplay competitions. Han was featured on the Syfy channel's Heroes of Cosplay, and has appeared as a guest judge on the TBS reality show King of the Nerds multiple times.

== Early life ==
Han was born in Xian, China and spent her teenage years in Germany, where she was raised by her mother and stepfather. She immigrated to America in 1998 where she later discovered cosplay at Anime Expo in 1999. Her first cosplay was as Kurama from YuYu Hakusho. She is entirely self-taught.

== Career ==
In 2013, Han appeared in the Syfy show Heroes of Cosplay. In the show she is framed as a master cosplayer who advises the younger cosplayers and, rather than competing in, is judging the cosplay competitions. The show manufactured a conflict between Han and other famous cosplayer Jessica Nigri, who was also offered a spot on the show but declined. She also found herself in controversy after making an allegedly fatphobic remark; she later clarified in her book that it was the result of editing by the show, which used her words out of context. Han later revealed that the show pressured her exiting her competitive retirement in order to compete on the show.

In 2015 and 2016, Han was featured in Marvel Cosplay Covers as Medusa and Scarlet Witch respectively. She later appeared in the Marvel video series "Marvel Becoming" where she was captured getting into cosplay as Gamora and Scarlet Witch.

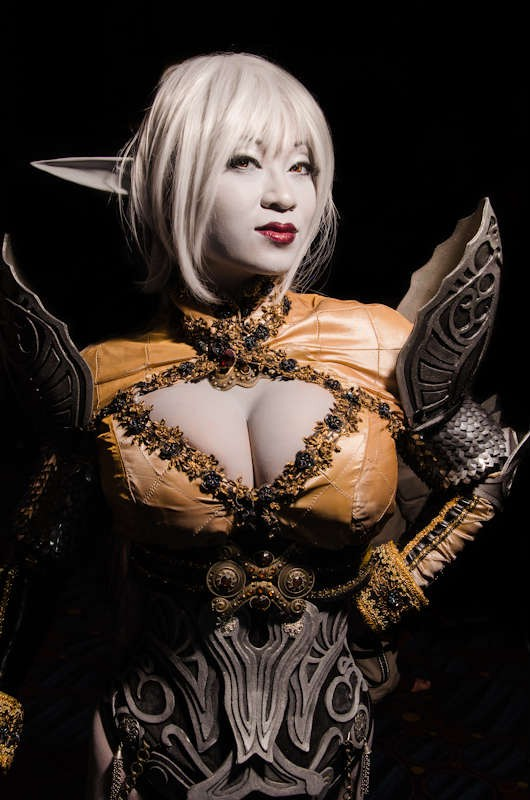
Yaya Han in 2012

In 2016, Han released a fabric line through JOANN Fabric & Craft Stores which aimed to make cosplay more accessible. After the closure of JOANN in 2025, she started to distribute the fabric line through Mood Fabrics and Linda's.

In 2021, Riot Games sponsored Han to cosplay the League of Legends champion Vayne, who was recently updated in celebration of the new 2021 season. That year she also promoted the Netflix show "Shadow and Bone" by cosplaying one of the show's characters and, in cosplay, interviewing actors from the show. In 2021, she also promoted Dungeon Fighter Overkill and Resident Evil Village by creating full cosplays of characters from the games.

In 2023, Han collaborated with bernette to release the bernette 79 Yaya Han Edition sewing machine, which she designed. In 2025, she followed this up with the release of the bernette 38 Yaya Han Edition sewing machine. These sewing machines, also equipped with the ability to embroider, aimed to provide users with versality and functionality.

== Personal life ==
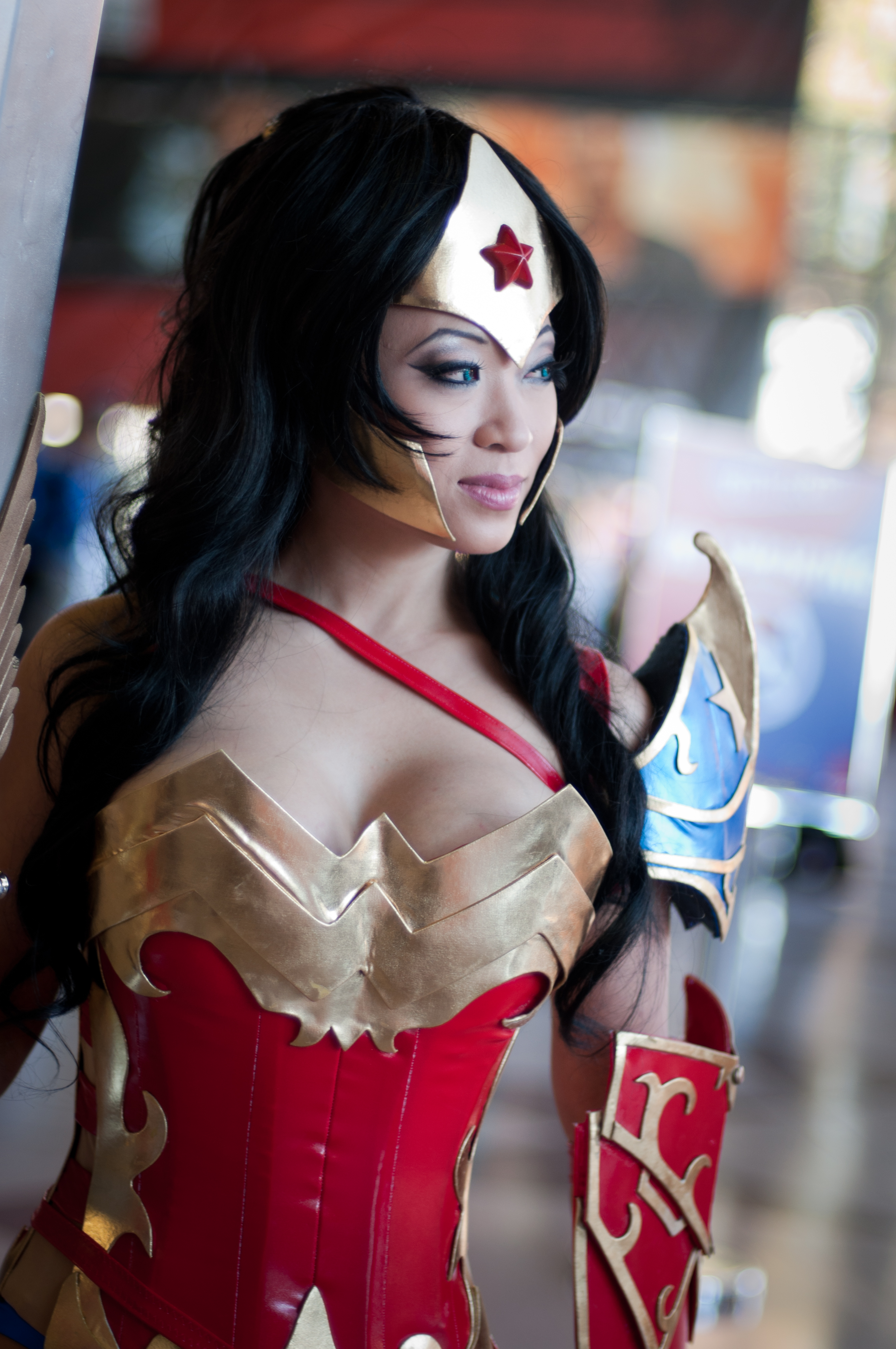
Yaya Han in 2010

Han is fluent in Chinese, German, and English. She identifies as German, but in recent years has started reclaiming her Chinese heritage. Han currently resides in Atlanta, Georgia.

== Bibliography ==
- Yaya Han's World of Cosplay: A Guide to Fandom Costume Culture (2020). Union Square & Co. ISBN 9781454932659
- 1000 incredible costume & cosplay ideas : a showcase of creative characters from anime, manga, video games, movies, comics and more! (2013) – with Allison DeBlasio & Joey Marcsocci. Quarry Books. ISBN 9781592536986

== Filmography ==
| Year | Title | Role | Notes | Source |
|---|---|---|---|---|
| 2013 | Heroes of Cosplay | Herself | | |
| 2013, 2014 | King of the Nerds | Herself | Guest Judge | |
| 2014 | Archangel: From the Winter's End Chronicles | Jasmin Synn | | |
| 2016 | Archangel: Deadliest of the Species | Jasmin Synn | | |
| 2018 | Cosplay Universe | Herself | | |
