= Riki LeCotey =

Canadian cosplayer, model and costume designer

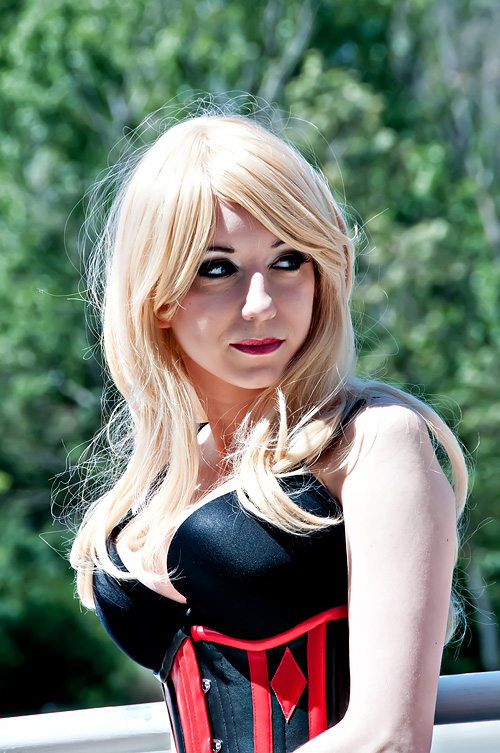
- LeCotey as Harley Quinn at the Geek Fashion Show 2013
- Born: October 27; Canada
- Other names: Riddle, Riki
- Citizenship: Canadian
- Occupations: Cosplayer, model, costume designer
- Modeling information
- Height: 5 ft 1 in (155 cm)
- Hair color: Brown
- Eye color: Brown

Riki LeCotey, also known as Riddle, is a Canadian cosplayer, model and costume designer based in the United States. She is regarded by some as one of the top cosplayers in North America or even in the world.

== Career ==
LeCotey has been cosplaying for over a decade, and was a cosplay judge and special guest at many fan conventions in the US and around the world, including in Dubai, Ireland, Chile, and the UK. She was a main cast member on both seasons of Syfy channel reality show Heroes of Cosplay in 2013–2014. She has worked as a specialty costumer on movies such as X-Men: First Class and Captain America: Civil War , and was featured in PBA's 2012 documentary Cosplay: Crafting a Secret Identity. She is also the creator of a charity group, Cosplay for a Cause, whose first project raised over $30,000 for the Japanese Red Cross after the 2011 tsunami.

== Filmography ==
reality television
Year	Title	Role	Source
2013	Heroes of Cosplay	Riki LeCotey	
2014	Heroes of Cosplay	Riki LeCotey	

== Gallery ==
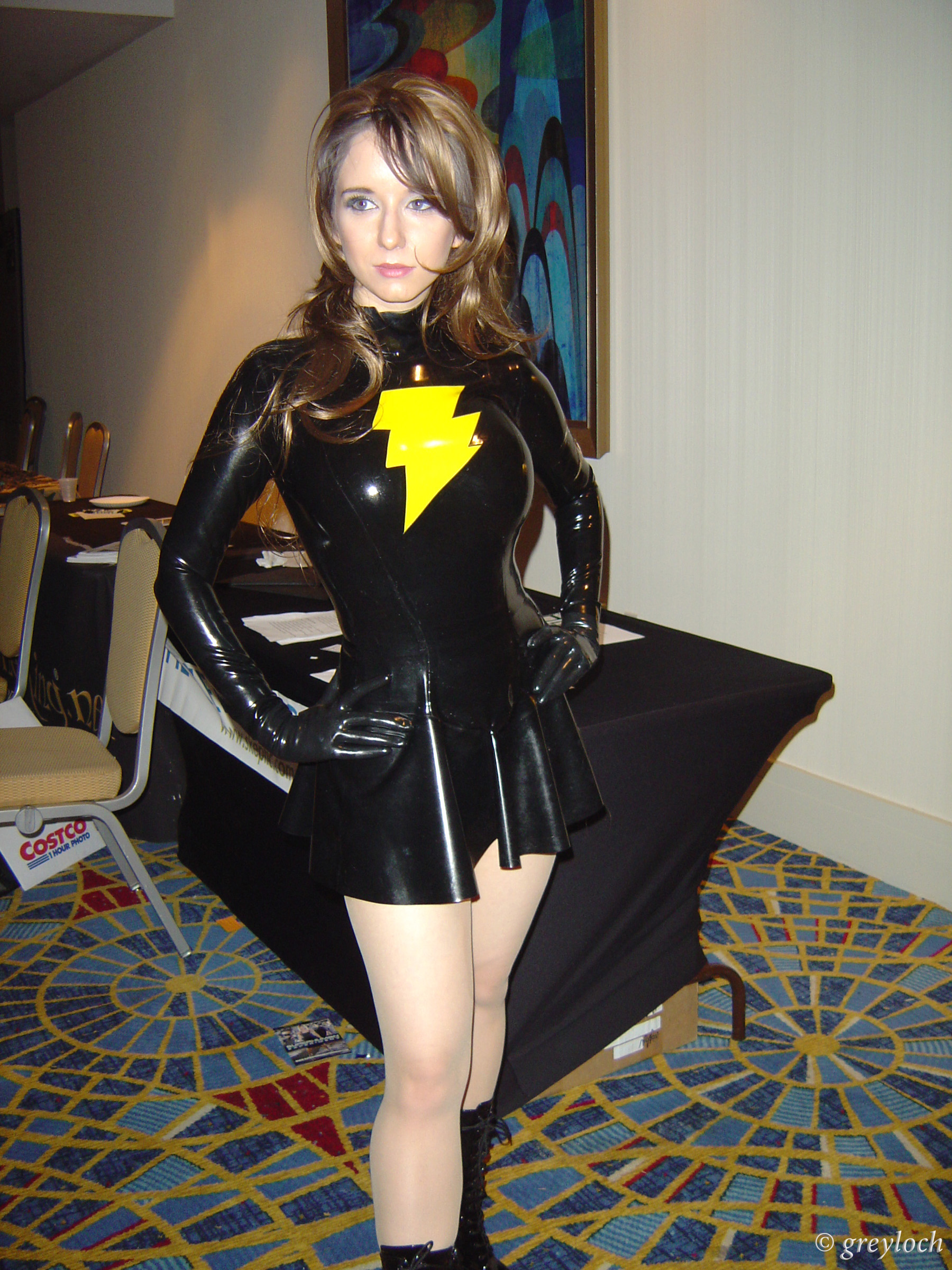
Mary Marvel, Dragon Con 2008

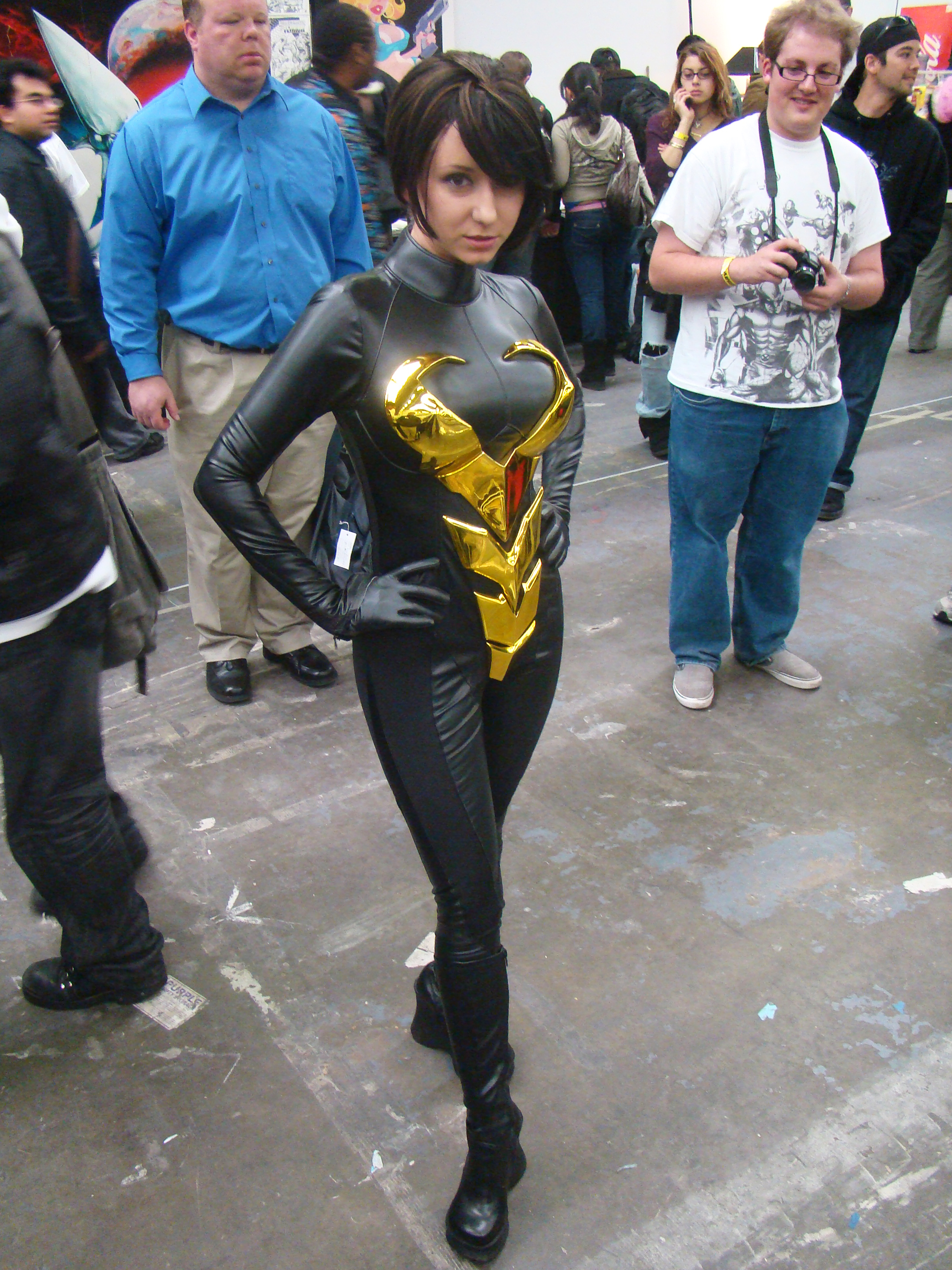
The Wasp, Big Apple Con 2009

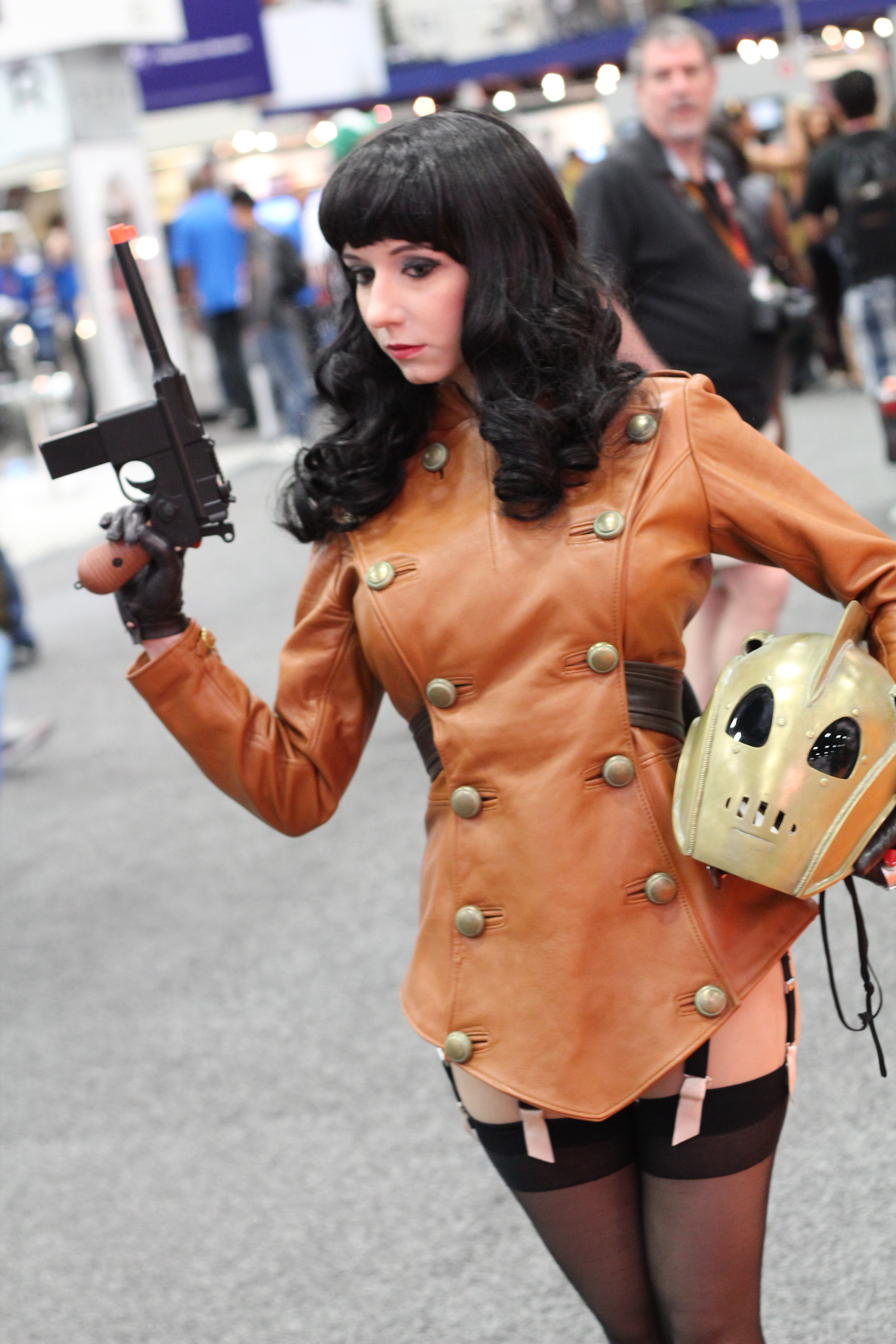
The Rocketeer, San Diego Comic-Con 2012

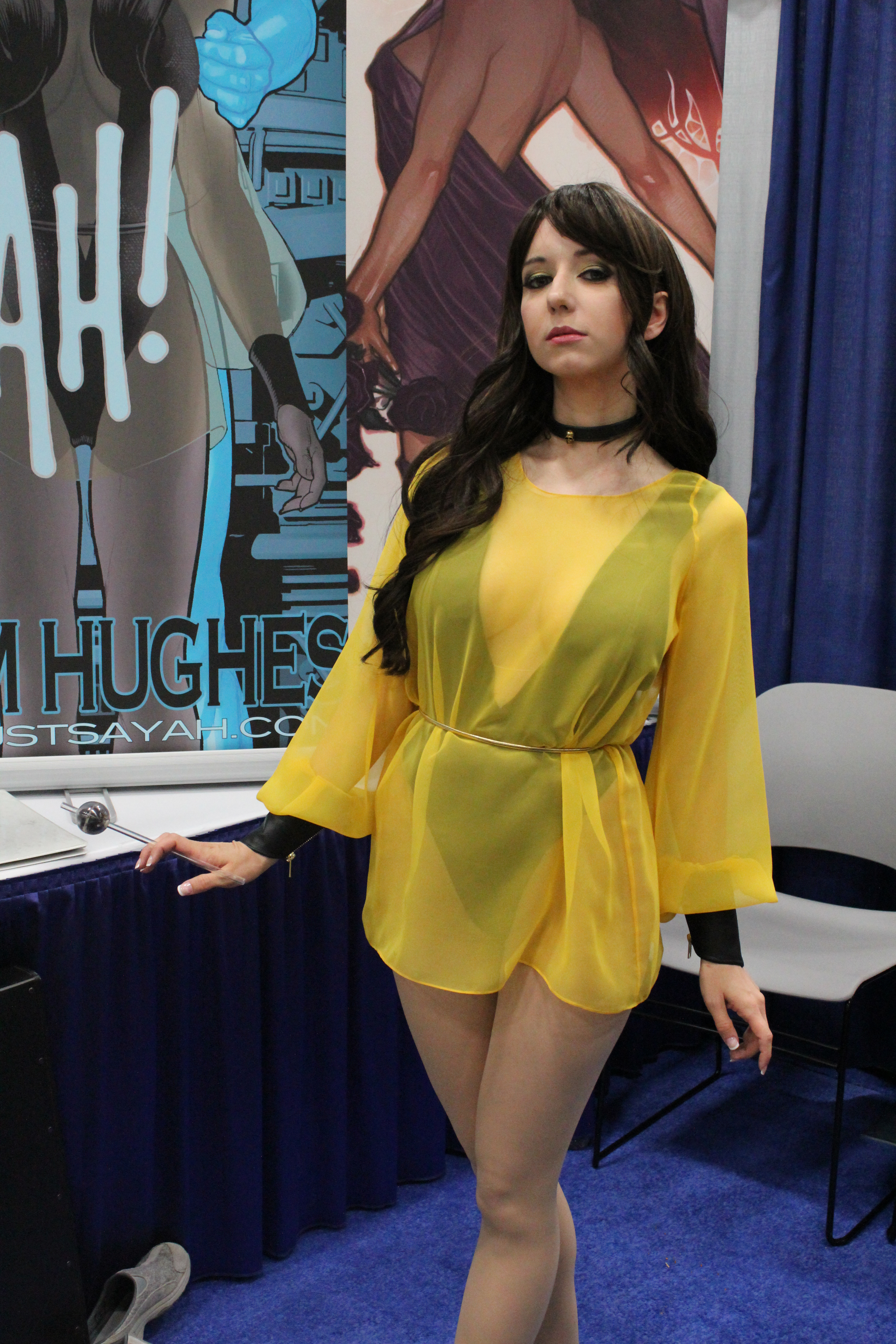
Silk Spectre, San Diego Comic-Con 2012

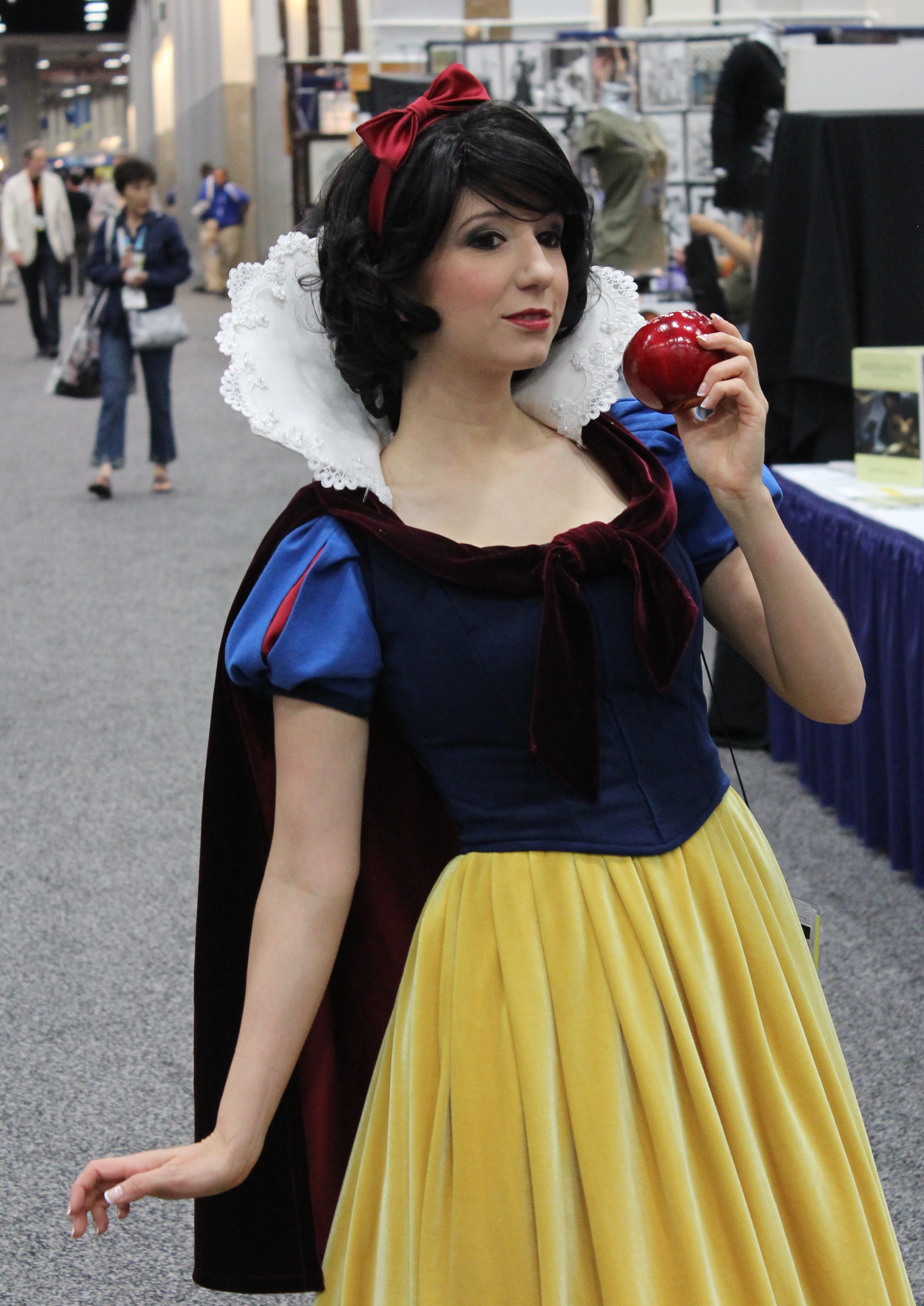
Snow White, San Diego Comic-Con 2012

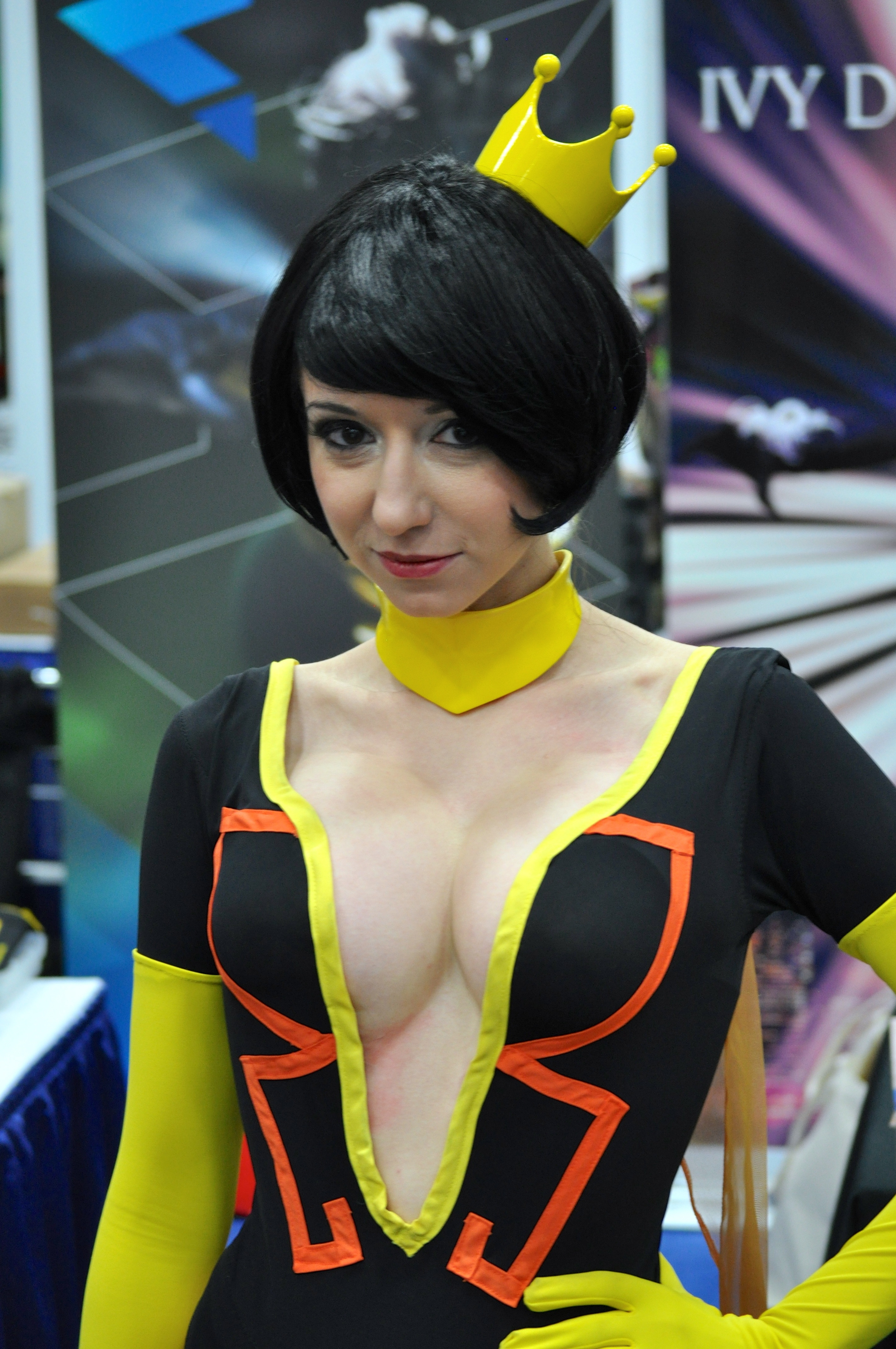
Dr. Mrs. The Monarch, San Diego Comic-Con 2013
