= Montreal Comiccon =

Multi-genre fan convention in Canada

Montreal Comiccon Le Comiccon de Montréal
- Montreal Comiccon logo (2013-)
- Status: Active
- Venue: Place Bonaventure (2006-2011); Palais des Congrès (2012-)
- Locations: Montreal, Quebec
- Country: Canada
- Inaugurated: 2006
- Attendance: 58,000 in 2017
- Organizer: Major Comics and other affiliated comic book stores
- Website: https://www.montrealcomiccon.com

The Montreal Comiccon (French: Le Comiccon de Montréal), under its current form, was launched in 2006 as "Montreal Comic-Con". The event features comic books, toys, games, science-fiction, horror, anime, non-sport cards and collectibles. It is held 2 times a year at the Palais des Congrès convention center in downtown Montreal, with the larger "Comic-Con" taking place in July over the course of 3 days. The same organizers also hold a smaller one or two-day "Mini-Con", traditionally held at the end of the fall season, in early December.

Special guests, artists, exhibitors and special contests make the Comiccon suitable for children and adults. The September 2012 edition featured guests such as William Shatner (Star Trek), Patrick Stewart (Star Trek: The Next Generation), Malcolm McDowell ("A Clockwork Orange"), James Marsters (Buffy the Vampire Slayer) and other special guests.

The Montreal Comiccon is a fan convention with multi-genre content, with focus on comics, sci-fi, horror, anime and games. While sharing common traits with San Diego Comic-Con, the Montreal Comiccon differentiates itself by offering a variety of attractions catering to both the anglophone and francophone population markets of Montreal, and bridging the gap between American comics and European bande dessinée with cross-border and overseas guests and attractions.

== Programming ==
As with most other comics conventions, the Montreal Comiccon offers a select range of activities, exhibits, and other attractions. Comiccon's large exhibit hall on the second floor includes Artist Alley, a Retailers section, an Autograph Area, Photo Ops booth and several exhibits. Most of the scheduled events take place on the convention center's upper floors: on the fifth and seventh floors.

Fans are encouraged to come dressed as their favourite pop culture characters, be they from movies, TV, video games or comics. This is commonly referred to as cosplay. It culminates at the Masquerade, the big costuming competition that brings in judges from across the globe, over 60 competitors, and close to 3000 fans to cheer them on when they hit the big stage.

Over the course of three days, fans are treated to over 100 different panel discussions and workshops that help further promote comics, costuming, gaming and pop culture in general. A gaming zone for fans to discover new game demos, participate in tourneys or simply enjoy some free-play. Video games are feature for both indie games and AAA studios with demos. Screenings for short and feature films are presented that include fans films, as well as independent and studio productions.

Celebrity guests will usually participate in three activities: Autograph sessions, Photo Ops and a Q&A/panel.

Since 2014, Montreal Comiccon has incorporated musical performances ranging from pop, folk, hip hop and orchestral music, featuring music inspired by movies and TV shows like Star Wars, Star Trek, Jurassic Park, Harry Potter and more.

== History ==
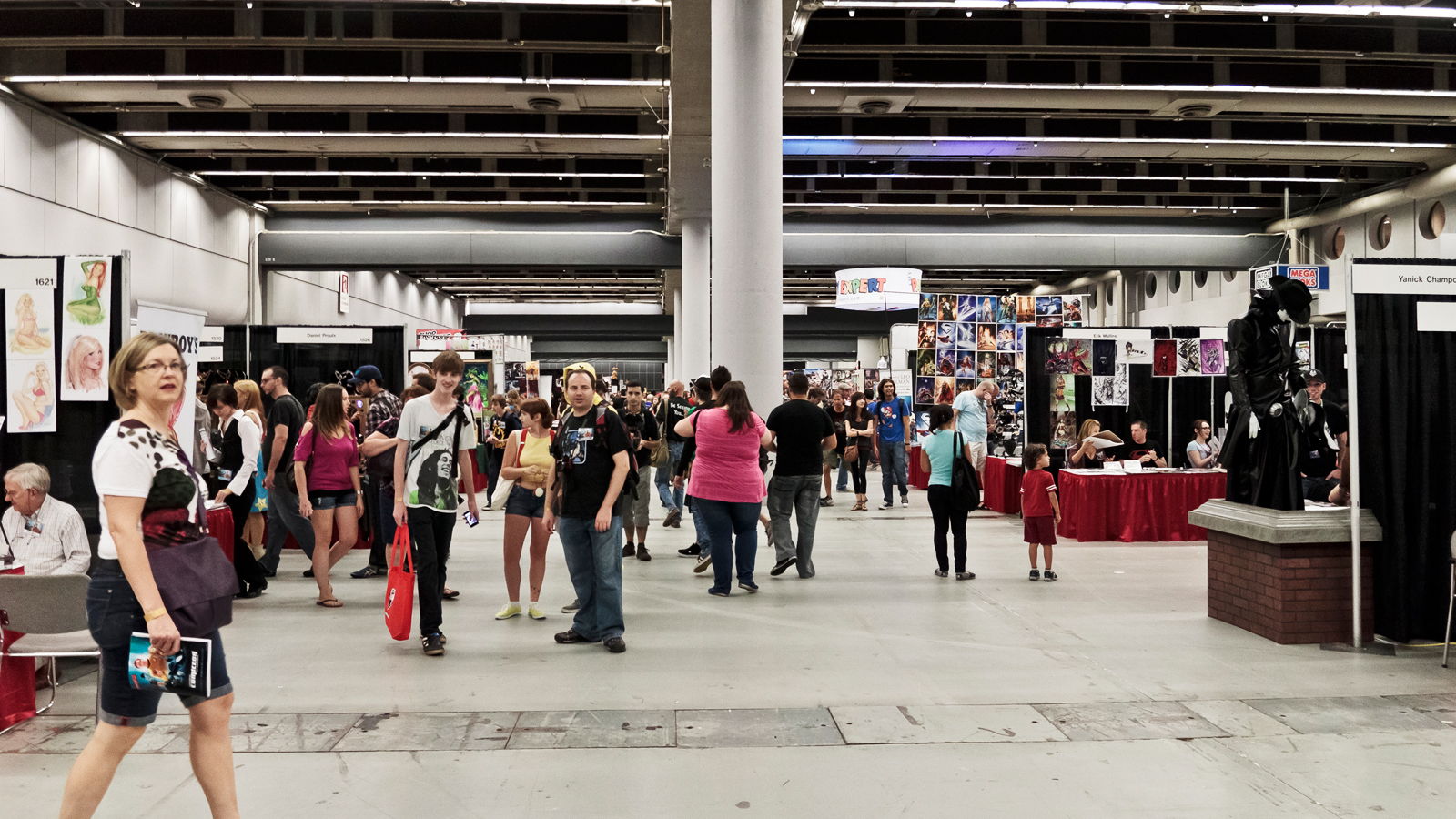
View of the main hall during the 2012 edition

The Montreal Comiccon held its first edition in 2006 at the Place Bonaventure exhibition center. In 2009, the event re-branded as a pop culture event, adding guests from comic books, anime voice acting, and genre television and film. From 2006 to 2010, the Comiccon was held in room 200-N, a low-ceiling windowless exhibition hall beneath the main hall. Due to 2010's outstanding success, the 2011 show was moved to Place Bonaventure's main hall to accommodate the increased attendance, giving them about three times more space to move around.

The 2012 Montreal Comiccon was held on the weekend of September 14–16, 2012. Due to unexpected demand from the 2011 event, the Montreal Comiccon expanded to a full three days in 2012. The Comiccon also changed venue in 2012, from Place Bonaventure to newer and larger convention facilities at the Palais des congrès de Montréal.

The Canadian Comic Book Creator Awards Organization agreed in principle with the organizers of the Montreal Comiccon and presented the 8th Annual Joe Shuster Awards in conjunction with the event on the evening of Saturday, September 15, 2012.

Due to growing attendance rates, the 2015 was held in July instead of September in order to use the entire floor space of the Palais des congrès.

The organizers run a smaller 1-day convention in December called the "Mini-Comiccon". The 2012 Mini-Comiccon was held on Saturday, December 8 at the Palais des Congrès in Montreal. It offered smaller selections of guests, dealers and artists, but offered at the same time more opportunities throughout the year for fans to purchase comics, meet celebrities and wear costumes, among other things. The admission prices were also lower. The organizational structure remained the same as the main September 3-day edition, but with slightly less staff and volunteers. As of 2015, the December has been free admission. In 2016 it expanded to two days.

In 2020, due to the COVID-19 pandemic in Montreal, the Montreal Comiccon was cancelled for the first time.

=== Dates and locations ===
Note: Only September/July editions are shown here.

Dates	Location	Attendance (turnstile)	Notable guests	Notes
September 2006	Place Bonaventure; Montreal, Quebec	...	...	First edition, as a comic book dealer event.
September 15–16, 2007	Place Bonaventure; Montreal, Quebec	700	...	...
September 13–14, 2008	Place Bonaventure; Montreal, Quebec	1,100	...	...
September 19–20, 2009	Place Bonaventure; Montreal, Quebec	4,000	Lou Ferrigno, Jeremy Bulloch, Honky Tonk Man and Noelle Hannibal, with Brad Swaile.	Re-branded as a pop culture event, Comiccon welcomes its first media guests.
September 11–12, 2010	Place Bonaventure; Montreal, Quebec	8,300	Comic Book & Bandes Dessinées Guests Ethan Van Sciver, Darick Robertson, Leonard Kirk, Herb Trimpe, Dale Eaglesham, Elvira, Mistress of the Dark, Larry Hama, Tim Sale, April Anna, Barbara Canepa, Cameron Stewart, Denis Rodier, Geof Isherwood, Gibson Quarter, Tom Fowler, Michel Lacombe, Michel Falardeau, Richard Serrao, Kelly Tindall, Jacques Lamontagne, Jimmy Suzan, Kate Bradley. Media Guests Brent Spiner, Billy Dee Williams, Peter Mayhew, Elvira, Mistress of the Dark, Maria de Aragon a.k.a. Greedo from Star Wars, Kirby Morrow, and Noelle Hannibal from Star Trek: First Contact	Last time the main September edition was held in room 200-N. High attendance numbers prompts the organizers to move to the main hall.
September 17–18, 2011	Place Bonaventure; Montreal, Quebec	20,000+	Comic Book & Bandes Dessinées Guests Stan Lee (Guest of Honour), Neal Adams, Josh Adams, Sergio Aragonés, Jim Starlin (canceled), Stan Sakai, Gail Simone, Joe Benitez, Pia Guerra, Ian Boothby, Herb Trimpe, Dale Eaglesham, Ty Templeton, Diana Schutz, Conor McCreery, Anthony Del Col, Kelly Tindall, Tom Fowler, Dan Parent, Fabrice Tarrin, Nicolas Kéramidas, Yves Rodier, Denis Rodier, Michel Lacombe, Benoit Godbout, Frédéric Antoine, Jacques Lamontagne, Dany. Media Guests Adam West, Burt Ward, James Marsters, Doug Bradley, Sid Haig, Michael Dorn, Marina Sirtis, David Prowse (canceled), Clare Kramer, Mercedes McNab, Jeremy Bulloch, Maria de Aragon, Gil Gerard, Erin Gray, Noelle Hannibal, Vic Mignogna, Sgt. Slaughter, Rick Martel, Todd van der Heyden. Cosplay Guests Lillyxandra, KellyJane, TealPirate	First time the main September edition was held in the main hall. Attendance reaches facility limit and Montreal Fire Marshal's office halts ticket sales for three hours on Saturday.
September 14–16, 2012	Palais des congrès de Montréal; Montreal, Quebec	32,000	Comic Book & Bandes Dessinées Guests Mike Mignola, George Pérez, Jim Starlin, Tim Sale, Darwyn Cooke, David Finch, Richard Starkings, Yanick Paquette, Karl Kerschl, Lar Desouza, Ryan Sohmer, Dan Parent, Kelly Tindall, Geof Isherwood, Marvin Mariano, Ray Fawkes, Aislin, Ben Templesmith, Karl Kerschl, Marco Rudy, Frank Cho, Valentine De Landro, Matteo Scalera, Ty Templeton, Doug Sneyd, Anthony Del Col, Conor McCreery, Becky Cloonan, Dave Cooper, Mike del Mundo, Adrian Alphona, Craig Yeung, Michel Rabagliati, Réal Godbout, Pierre Fournier, Jacques Lamontagne, François Lapierre, Patrick Boutin, Paolo Serpieri, Philippe Berthet, Siris, Félix Meyet, Harry Edwood, Yves Rodier, Frédéric Antoine, Michel Lacombe. Media Guests Patrick Stewart (Guest of Honour), William Shatner (Guest of Honour), Wil Wheaton, Brent Spiner, John de Lancie, Malcolm McDowell, James Marsters, Nicholas Brendon, Laura Vandervoort, Gunnar Hansen, Lloyd Kaufman, Kevin Sorbo, Ben Templesmith, Frank Cho, Eddie McClintock, Aaron Ashmore, Sam Huntington, Kristen Hager, Sam Witwer, Meaghan Rath, Gavin Blair, Elias Toufexis, Jean-Pierre Talbot, Heroes of the North, Patrick Sénécal, Noelle Hannibal, Maxime Martin, Julie du Page, Véronique Tremblay, Rémy Couture, Johnny Yong Bosh, Bryan Perro, Tom Savini, Neil Napier, Michelle Boback, Shawn Baichoo, Amber Goldfarb, Paula Jean Hixson, Kate Drummond	Change of venue. First edition to be a 3-day event.
September 13–15, 2013	Palais des congrès de Montréal; Montreal, Quebec	42,000+	Comic Book & Bandes Dessinées Guests Becky Cloonan, Neal Adams, Adam Kubert, Arthur Suydam, Bob Layton, Chris Claremont, Dale Eaglesham, Mike Rooth, Dan Parent, David Finch, Geof Isherwood, George Pérez, Herb Trimpe (cancelled), Kaare Andrews, Marco Rudy, Kelly Tindall, Michael Dooney, Nick Bradshaw, Rags Morales, Richard Starkings, Simon Bisley, Ty Templeton, Yanick Paquette Media Guests Gillian Anderson (Guest of Honour), Christopher Lloyd (Guest of Honour), George Takei, Sean Astin, Jason Mewes, Felicia Day, Edward James Olmos, James Callis, Michael Hogan, Tahmoh Penikett, Jason Momoa, Jason David Frank, Margot Kidder, Lou Ferrigno, Mick Foley, Kevin Nash, Chris Jericho, Maryse Ouellet, Bret Hart, William Katt, Theresa Tilly, Ellen Sandweiss, Betsy Baker, Frazer Hines, Ray Park, Manu Bennett, Noelle Hannibal, Amber Goldfarb, Daniel Logan, Didier Lucien, Elias Toufexis, François Perusse, Pat Mastroianni, Michael Berryman, Lloyd Kaufman, Carrie Fisher (Cancelled), Katee Sackhoff (cancelled), Tricia Helfer (cancelled), Laurie Holden (cancelled), Michael Rooker (cancelled). Cosplay Guests Jessica Nigri, Kamui, Monika Lee, Marie-Claude Bourbonnais	...
September 12–14, 2014	Palais des congrès de Montréal; Montreal, Quebec	51,000	Comic Book & Bandes Dessinées Guests Nick Bradshaw, Simon Bisley, Larry Hama (Cancelled), Aislin, Glenn Fabry, Daniel Way, Anne Robillard, Thierry Labrosse, Zviane, Régis Loisel, Andy Bélanger, Ben Templesmith, Bob Camp, Brian Pulido, Clayton Crain, Denis Rodier, Gautier Langevin, Olivier Carpentier, Geof Isherwood, Jean-Baptiste Monge, Kaare Andrews, Karl Kerschl, Kelly Tindall, Ken Levin, Luc Bossé, Mike Rooth, Marco Rudy, Paolo Pantalena, Rémi Maynègre, Richard Isanove, Richard Comely, Richard Suicide, Samuel Cantin, Sophie Bédard, Stéphanie Leduc, Tim Vigil, Tristan Roulot, Patrick Hénaff, Vincent Pompetti, Tarek, Wes Craig, Yan Mongrain, Yanick Paquette, Yohann Morin. Media Guests Sir Patrick Stewart, Norman Reedus, Colin Baker, Stephen Amell, Hulk Hogan, Katee Sackhoff, Tricia Helfer, Karl Urban, George A. Romero, Amy Dumas, Trish Stratus, Jimmy Hart, Brent Spiner, Danny Glover, Denise Crosby, Gates McFadden, John de Lancie, Jonathan Frakes, LeVar Burton, Marina Sirtis, Michael Dorn, Matt Smith (cancelled), Katie Cassidy (cancelled), Osric Chau, Billy Boyd, Julie Benz, Carl Weathers, Austin St. John, Walter Jones, David Yost, Ken Foree, Robert Englund, Amanda Wyss, Heather Langenkamp, Emily Kinney, Lawrence Gilliard Jr., Katharine Isabelle, Traci Lords, Julian Sands, Soska Sisters, Jacques Rougeau Jr., Jake The Snake Roberts (cancelled). Cosplay Guests Yaya Han, LeeAnna Vamp, Marie-Claude Bourbonnais, Monika Lee.	...
July 3–5, 2015	Palais des congrès de Montréal; Montreal, Quebec	51,000	Comic Book & Bandes Dessinées Guests Aislin, Alex A., Darwyn Cooke, Jacques Lamontagne, Jae Lee, James O'Barr, Michael Golden, Michel Falardeau, Mike Rooth, Whilce Portacio, Alexandre Fontaine Rousseau, Andy Bélanger, Ariane-Li Simard-Côté, Arthur Suydam, Dan Parent, Dave Ross, Denis Rodier, Eric Talbot, Ethan Van Sciver (postponed), Frédéric Antoine, Frédéric Millaire-Zouvi, François Lapierre, Front Froid, Gabriel Lessard, Gabriel Morrissette, Gautier Langevin, Geof Isherwood, Gilbert Lachance, Heroes of the North, Jacques, Samson, James Raiz, Jean-Baptiste Monge, Jean-Dominic Leduc, Jim Su, Julie Rocheleau, Karibu, Kelly Tindall (postponed), Kevin Maguire, Les Apatrides, Maël Davan-Soulas, Marco Rudy, Michel Lacombe, Michel Viau, Mike Zeck, Nick Bradshaw, Olivier Carpentier, Philippe Martin, Renee Witterstaetter, Richard Suicide, Samuel Cantin, Scott Kolins, Sophie Bédard, Stéphanie Leduc, Tarek, Thierry Labrosse, Ty Templeton, Vincent Pompetti, Yan Mongrain, Yanick Paquette, Yohann Morin, Zviane, Francis Manapul, Neal Adams, Becky Cloonan, Ben Templesmith, Benoît Rousseau, Cathon, Media Guests Guests of Honour: Billie Piper, John Barrowman, Karen Gillan, and Ron Perlman. Featured Guests: Gwendoline Christie, Jason Momoa, Caitlin Blackwood, David Ramsey, Doug Bradley, Eve Myles, Garrett Wang, George Mihalka, Giancarlo Esposito, Graham McTavish, Hayley Atwell, J. August Richards, Jeffrey Combs, Jewel Staite, Joe Flanigan, Josh McDermitt, Kane Hodder, Kevin Smith, Mark Meer, Mark Pellegrino, Michael Rooker, Mitch Pileggi, Raphael Sbarge, Road Warrior Animal, Ron Simmons, Scott Wilson, Sean Gunn, Steve Blum, Steve Cardenas, Veronica Taylor, Hubert Gagnon, Hugolin Chevrette-Landesque, Johanne Léveillé, Cast from LARPs: The Series, 2 Cold Scorpio, Béatrice Picard, Charles Martinet Cosplay Guests Ivy Doomkitty, Monika Lee, Montreal's Wolverine, Riddle, Simon Fontaine	Change of month. eSports events and competition added.
July 8–10, 2016	Palais des congrès de Montréal, Montreal, Quebec	56,000	Comic Book & Bandes Dessinées Guests Bob Layton, Cary Nord, Darryl "DMC" McDaniels, David Lloyd, Francis Manapul, Greg Land, Jeik Dion, Leo Fafard, Marcus To, Michael Golden, Mike Grell, Neal Adams, Tom Grummett, Andy Bélanger, Bryan Perro, Dan Parent, Dave Ross, Djibril Morissette, Eric Talbot, Fernando Ruiz, Gabriel Morrissette, Gautier Langevin, Gisèle Lagacé, Greg Hyland, Jamie Tyndall, Jean-Baptiste Monge, Jimmy Suzan, Joë Tbo, Marco Rudy, Marguerite Sauvage, Mel Gosselin, Mike Rooth, Nick Bradshaw, Olivier Carpentier, Rémi Maynègre, Renee Witterstaetter, Richard Comely, Richard Pace, Robert Bailey, Rossi Gifford, Stéphanie Leduc, Thierry Labrosse, Ty Templeton, Yanick Paquette Media Guests Guests of Honor: John Barrowman, Kate Mulgrew, Tom Felton, and William Shatner. Featured Guests: Alfonso Ribeiro, Amy Matysio, Arryn Zech, Billy Dee Williams, Bob Morley, Brent Spiner, Brett Dalton, Cary Elwes, Chris Sarandon, Elias Toufexis, Eliza Dushku, Eric Bischoff, Ernie Hudson (postponed), Liam McIntyre, Linda Ballantyne, Manu Bennett, Michael Ironside, Morena Baccarin (postponed), Nichelle Nichols, Peter Cullen, Ric Flair, RoadKill Superstar, Robin Lord Taylor, Ryan Hurst, Scott Hall (postponed), Summer Glau, Toby Proctor, Vic Mignogna, Noelle Hannibal, Emersen Ziffle, Lowell Dean Cosplay Guests Jessica Nigri, Yaya Han, Kamui Cosplay, Kristen Hughey, Wolverine and the Montreal X-Men, Youppi!	...
July 7–9, 2017	Palais des congrès de Montréal, Montreal, Quebec	58,000	Comic Book & Bandes Dessinées Guests Jay Baruchel, Mark Bagley, Kevin Eastman, Adrian Harper, Aislin, Andy Bélanger, Anthony Ruttgaizer, Lee Moder, Dan Parent, Danica Brine, Dave Cooper, Dave Ross, Djibril Morisette, Eric Talbot, Fernando Ruiz, Gisele Lagace, Glenn Fabry, Greg Hyland, Howard Chaykin, Jamie Tyndall, Jeik Dion, Jimmy Suzan, Julien Paré-Sorel, Ken Lashley (cancelled), Marco Rudy, Marguerite Sauvage, Michel Falardeau, Michelle Delecki, Nick Bradshaw, Neal Adams, Gautier Langevin, Olivier Carpentier, Richard Pace, Rossi Gifford, RB White, Productions Windrose, Salgood Sam, Steve Lieber, Tom Fowler, Ty Templeton, Vincent Marcone, Yanick Paquette, Richard Comely, Leonard Kirk (cancelled), Jason Loo, Kalman Andrasofsky, Danny Zabal, Keith Morris, Andrew Wheeler, Tony White Media Guests David Tennant, Nathan Fillion, Sir Patrick Stewart, John Cusack, Jon Bernthal, Alex Kingston, Freema Agyeman, Elizabeth Henstridge, Enver Gjokaj, John Rhys-Davies, Steven Ogg (cancelled), James Marsters (cancelled), Jason Isaacs, Tia Carrere, Jeremy Bulloch, Kevin Sorbo, Ruth Connell, Sarah Wayne Callies, Will Friedle, Kevin Conroy, Charles Martinet, Brian Froud, Shawn Baichoo, Jonathan Dubsky, Ruffin Prentiss, Christopher Jacot, Tasya Teles (cancelled), John Tench, Adrienne Barbeau, Tony Todd, Double Experience, Okilly Dokilly, Mean Gene Okerlund, Pat Patterson, 2 Cold Scorpio Cosplay Guests Ireland Reid, Leon Chiro, LeeAnna Vamp, Wolverine and the Montreal X-Men	Family Zone added. eSports events cancelled. Orchestral concerts added to programming.
July 6–8, 2018	Palais des congrès de Montréal, Montreal, Quebec	60,000+	Comic Book & Bandes Dessinées Guests Aislin, Bryan Ferro, Dale Eaglesham, Dale Keown, David Lloyd, Don Rosa, Gerry Conway, Karl Kerschl, Larry Hama, Michael Cho, Neal Adams, Nick Spencer, Niko Henrichon, Steve Rude, Yannick Paquette, Andy Bélanger, Cab, Dan Parent, Danica Brine, Djilbil Morissete, Gautier Langevin, Geoff Isherwood, Gisèle Légacé, Ian Fortin, Jeik Dion, Jimmy Suzan, Joel Adams, Ken Lashley, Marco Rudy, Michel Falardeau, Nick Bradshaw, Olivier Carpentier, Productions Windrose, Richard Pace, Richard, Serrao Media Guests Guest Of Honor: Chuck Norris, Pamela anderson, David Duchovny, Jason Mamoa, Gillian Anderson(cancelled) Adrian Paul, Amanda Tapping, Arryn Zech, Barbara Dunkelman, Ben McKenzie, Caitlin Glass, Catherine Tate, Charlet chung, Danielle Panabaker (cancelled), Danny Trejo, David Mazouz, Doug Jones, Gaboom Films, James Marsters (cancelled), Jason David Frank, Jennifer Morrisson, John Barrowman, Julian Glover, Kara Eberle, Le Jeu C'est Sérieux, Lindsay Jones, Mark Shepard, Michael Jones, Mitch Pileggi, Morena Baccarin, Pom Klementieff, Ray Park (cancelled), Sonequa Martin-Green, William B. Davis, Émi Morissette, Val Kilmer Cosplay Guests Henchman studios, Indra Rojas, John torres, Leon Chiro, Wolverine and the Montreal X-Men	...
July 5–7, 2019	Palais des congrès de Montréal, Montreal, Quebec	60,000+	Comic Book & Bandes Dessinées Guests Axelle Lenoir, Brian Azzarello, Dale Eaglesham, Jim Shooter, Kevin Eastman, Kevin Nowlan, Mike Grell, Rags Morales, Troy Little, Adam Gorham, Aislin, Al Gofa, Andy Bélanger, Boum, Caroline "Cab" Breault, Dan Parent, Danica Brine, Djibril Morissette, François Vigneault, Frédéric Antoine, Jean-François Laliberté, Jean-François Vachon, Jeik Dion, Jimmy Suzan, Marco Rudy, Nick Bradshaw, Olivier Carpentier, Pascal Blanché, Ponto, Sacha Lefebvre, Siris, Stéphanie Leduc, Thierry Labrosse, Thom, Tristan Roulot, Ty Templeton, Yanick Paquette, Yves Bourgelas Media Guests Guest Of Honor: Elijah Wood, Georges St-Pierre, James Phelps & Oliver Phelps, Robert Sheehan, Tom Felton, William Shatner Aaron Dismuke, Anson Mount, Austin St. John, B.E.R., Benz Antoine, Bob Morley, Cameron Brodeur, Chloe Hollings, Christopher Lambert, Christopher Wehkamp, Dan Fogler, David Fielding, Dean Cain, Eliza Taylor, Ethan Peck, Evan Marsh, Jake "The Snake" Roberts, Jim Cummings, Jodelle Ferland, Jonathan Di Bella, Jonathan Dubsky, Karan Ashley, Lana Parrilla, Laura Vandervoort, Lindsay Seidel, Lisa Marie Varon, Lou Ferrigno, Michael Madsen, Paige O'Hara, Ray Park, Shawn Baichoo, Tasya Teles, Walter E. Jones Internet Personalities and Cosplay Guests AceGamerSam, AlexDeadline, Andrew Speranza, BinaryAct, Critical_Max, EmeiiLeiiy, Fafouin, Iangon, LadyMP, MadameZoom, NokuBergy, PeachQc, SirèneFramboise Table Top Gaming Guests Andrew Bishkinskyi, Andrew Valkauskas, Gauthier Lacourte, Kyle Kinkade, Productions Windrose, Sean Gomes, Thibaud de la Touanne Cancelled: Marie-Claude Bourbonnais, Alan Tudyk, Michael Rosenbaum, Tom Welling, Rob Liefeld	...
July 3–5, 2020 (Cancelled)	Planned: Palais des congrès de Montréal, Montreal, Quebec	N/A	Cancelled	Cancelled due to the COVID-19 pandemic
July 9–11, 2021 (Cancelled)	Palais des congrès de Montréal, Montreal, Quebec	N/A	Cancelled	Cancelled due to the COVID-19 pandemic
July 8–10, 2022	Palais des congrès de Montréal, Montreal, Quebec	62 000 +	Comic Book & Bandes Dessinées Guests Kevin Eastman, Jim Zub, Peter David, Aislin, Alex A., Andy Belanger, Axelle Lenoir, Boum, Caroline Cab Breault, Cathon, Claude Desrosiers, Dan Parent, Dave McCaig, Djibril Morisette, Étienne Poisson, Félix Laflamme, François Vigneault, Iris, Jean-François Laliberté, Jean-Paul Eid, Jeik Dion, Jimmy Suzan, Julien Paré-Sorel, Kelly Tindall, Marco Rudy, Marguerite Sauvage, Michel Rabagliati, Olivier Carpentier, Olivier Robin, Patrick Blanchette, Paul Fry, Pascal Girard, Sacha Lefebvre, Sweeney Boo, Xavier Cadieux, Yanick Paquette, Zoe Qiu Media Guests Guests Of Honor:Dave Foley, Malcolm McDowell Alice Krige, Bonnie Wright, Bruce Boxleitner, Cerina Vincent, Clive Standen, Colton Haynes, Derek Johns, Elias Toufexis, Grace Van Dien, James Marsters, Jason Cavalier, Jim Beaver, Katherine McNamara, Lindsay Morgan, Mason Dye, Matthew Lewis, Noelle Hannibal, Charles Martinet, Rekha Sharma, Robert Patrick, roger Clark, Ted Raimi, Wilson Cruz, Kevin Owens, The Cybertronic Spree The cast of Farador: Eric K. Boulianne, Catherine Brunet, Benoit Drouin-Germain, Lucien Ratio, Edouard Tremblay Canceled: Laz Alonzo, Ray Fisher, John DiMaggio, Jessie T. Usher	back after 2 years of being canceled because of the COVID-19 pandemic
July 14–16, 2023	Palais des congrès de Montréal, Montreal, Quebec	65 000 +	Comic Book & Bandes Dessinées Guests Arthur Suydam, Ed Brisson, Geof Isherwood, Greg Capullo, Michael Golden, Mike Grell, Rags Morales, Aaron Reynolds, April Petchsri, Axelle Lenoir, Boum, Cab, Caroline Soucy, Claude Desrosiers, Dan Parent, Denis Rodier, Félix Laflamme, Hailey Brown, Hugh Rookwood, Jean-François Laliberté, Jeik Dion, Julien Paré-Sorel, Mike Rooth, Olivier Carpentier, Réal Godbout, Renée Witterstaetter, Sacha Lefebvre, Sophie Bédard, Ulises Fariñas (more to be added by July 2023). Media Guests Guests Of Honor: Christina Ricci, Jamie Campbell Bower David Ramsey, Emily Swallow, Erica Durance, John Barrowman, John DiMaggio, Kristin Kreuk, Kurt Angle, Lance Henriksen, Laura Vandervoort, Lexa Doig, Michael Biehn, Michael Rosenbaum, Michael Shanks, Paul Sun-Hyung Lee, Stephen Amell, Tom Welling, Jonathan Frakes, John de Lancie, Todd Stashwick, Trish Stratus, Grace Van Dien Announcements continue until June 2023
July 5–7, 2024	Palais des Congrès de Montréal, Montréal, Québec		Media Guests Guests of Honour: Kevin Smith, Robert Englund, Vincent D'Onofrio Rob Van Dam, Steven John Ward, Heather Langenkamp, Alan Tudyk, Ray Park, Henry Ian Cusick, Kevin Nash, Lou Ferrigno, Gates McFadden, Brent Spiner, Michael Dorn, Trailer Park Boys, Cal Dodd, Eric Vale, Todd Haberkorn, George Buza, Erika Harlacher, Dante Basco, Dallas Liu, Tom Glynn-Carney, Jeff Ward, Giancarlo Esposito, Veronica Taylor, Gordon Cormier, Jodi Benson, Tom Cavanagh, Danielle Panabaker, Carlos Valdes, Maggie Robertson, Nick Castle, Lisa Wilcox, Amanda Wyss, Melinda Clarke, Ronee Blakley

== See also ==
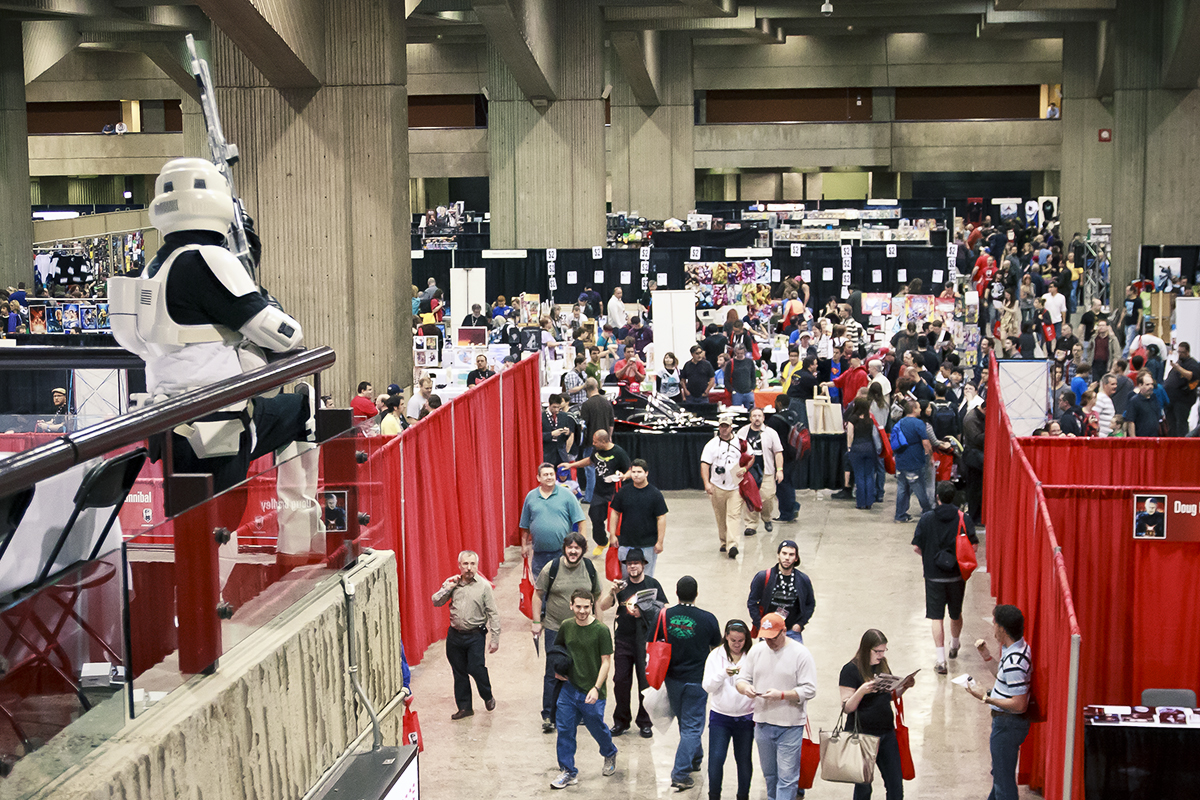
View of the main hall during the 2011 edition

- List of comic book conventions
- Otakuthon, Montreal's anime convention
- Fan Expo Canada in Toronto, Ontario, Canada's largest multigenre convention
- Ottawa Comiccon in Ottawa, Ontario
