= Wasabi Anime =

- Industry: Fan Conventions & Events
- Founded: August 13, 2001
- Founder: Tom Croom
- Headquarters: Florida
- Parent: Green Mustard Entertainment, Inc.
- Website: GreenMustard.com

Wasabi Anime, also known as Green Mustard Entertainment, is a company specializing in the production of events and programming for anime conventions and other fan conventions in North America, as well as hosting their own standalone conventions. The company's journey began in 2001 with the registration of the WasabiAnime.com website. It started as an anime club, later evolving into a limited liability company (LLC) in 2007, and ultimately becoming a corporation in 2010. As of July 2012, Wasabi Anime had organized events in California, Florida, Georgia, Indiana, and Las Vegas.

== History ==
Wasabi Anime was founded by Tom Croom and a group of passionate anime enthusiasts shortly after the successful completion of Anime Festival Orlando II in Kissimmee, Florida. Recognizing the need to support a broader spectrum of fandoms, Wasabi Anime (initially known as "Wasabi Anime of Florida") established a network of anime clubs, providing assistance to existing clubs while nurturing the growth of new ones. Members of the Wasabi Anime clubs were issued photo ID cards that granted discounts at local anime and comic stores in Florida.

Some of the clubs included in the Wasabi Anime network were:

- Anime Goes Anime Club Miami
- Gator Anime
- HIYAH! The Southwest Florida Anime Club
- Japanese Animation Club of Tallahassee
- Lake Brantley High School Anime & SciFi Club
- Mile Stretch Anime Club
- North Port Anime Club
- Oukyuu Anime Club
- Wasabi Anime: Deltona
- Wasabi Anime: Englewood
- Wasabi Anime: Ft. Lauderdale
- Wasabi Anime: Green Cove Springs (which later became the Anime Belle Club)
- Wasabi Anime: Jacksonville
- Wasabi Anime: Miami
- Wasabi Anime: New Smyrna Beach
- Wasabi Anime: Orlando
- Wasabi Anime: Tampa (which eventually formed the original volunteer staff for MetroCon 2003)
- Wasabi Anime: Titusville
- Wasabi Anime: Treasure Coast
- Wasabi Anime: West Palm Beach

Periodically, the core team at Wasabi Anime hosted standalone events aimed at bringing these clubs together. Notable among these were the Wasabi Anime Halloween Cosplay Parties in 2001 and 2003.

Around 2004, Wasabi Anime shifted its focus from networking clubs to designing and organizing events for anime and fan conventions. These events encompassed themed panels, game shows, dances, and stage performances, including the well-known "Wasabi Animusical."

== Appearances ==
Wasabi Anime has designed entertainment and programming for several anime and fan conventions since starting in 2001.

California

- Anime Expo 2012

Florida

- AccioCon (2009)
- Ancient City Con 4 (2010)
- Animation Supercon 2009
- Anime Express V (2002)
- Anime Express VI (2003)
- Anime Festival Orlando III (2002)
- Anime Festival Orlando IV (2003)
- Anime Festival Orlando V (2004)
- Anime Festival Orlando VI (2005)
- Anime Festival Orlando VII (2006)
- Anime Festival Orlando VIII (2007)
- Anime Festival Orlando IX (2008)
- Anime Festival Orlando X (2009)
- Anime Festival Orlando XI (2010)
- Anime Festival Orlando XIII (2012)
- Broward Anime Festival (2009)
- DreamCon (2004)
- FITCON 2003
- FITCON 2004
- FITCON 2008
- Florida Supercon 2009
- Florida Supercon 2010
- Florida Supercon 2011
- FX Show 2005
- FX Show 2006
- FX Show 2007
- FX Show 2008
- FX Show 2009
- JACON 2002
- JACON 2003
- JACON 2004
- JACON 2005
- JACON 2006
- JACON 2007
- JACON 2008
- MetroCon 2003
- MetroCon 2004
- The Nightmare Before Thanksgiving (2004)
- Umicon 2012
- Vulkon Orlando 2003
- Vulkon Tampa 2003
- YasumiCon 2003
- YasumiCon 2005

Georgia

- Anime Weekend Atlanta 15 (2009)
- Anime Weekend Atlanta 16 (2010)
- Anime Weekend Atlanta 17 (2011)
- Dragon*Con 2007
- Dragon*Con 2011
- MomoCon 2011

Indiana

- Gen Con 2010
- Gen Con 2011
- Gen Con 2012

Nevada

- NeonCon 2010

== Conventions ==
In 2007, Wasabi Anime began producing its fan conventions. Since some of these productions were not anime-centric, they often operated under corporate names (either Green Mustard, LLC or Green Mustard Entertainment, Inc.)

Convention Name	Theme	Dates	Location	Attendance	Guests
ASSIMILATION (as Green Mustard, LLC)	Science Fiction	September 29–30, 2007	Radisson Worldgate Resort Orlando; Kissimmee, FL	160 attendees (85 unique)	Ethan Phillips, Glenda Finkelstein, Michael A. Stackpole, Richard Horvitz, Rooster Teeth Productions, & Tracy Scoggins
MuggleCon (as Green Mustard, LLC)	Harry Potter	November 21–22, 2008	Ramada Orlando Celebration Resort & Convention Center; Kissimmee, FL	TBD	The House of Black & Witherwings
InvaderCON	Invader ZIM	March 26–27, 2011	Marriott Century Center; Atlanta, GA	TBD	Andy Berman, Eric Trueheart, Melissa Fahn, Richard Horvitz, & Rikki Simons
Florida Anime Experience 2011	Anime	May 27–29, 2011	Ramada Orlando Celebration Resort; Kissimmee, FL	1931 attendees (925 unique)	Anime World Order, Brett Weaver, Brittney Karbowski, Daric "Jingoro" Jackson, & Steve Blum
Florida Anime Experience 2012	Anime	May 25–27, 2012	International Palms Resort & Convention Center; Orlando, FL	2167 attendees (1027 unique)	Anime Addict Anonymous, Dan Woren, Darrel Guilbeau, Daric "Jingoro" Jackson, & Terri Hawkes
Project Anime 2012 (with Anime Expo)	Anime Conventions	June 27–28, 2012	Westin Bonaventure; Los Angeles, CA	33 unique	N/A (conference; no guests)
InvaderCON II: DOOMCON	Invader ZIM	July 28–29, 2012	Torrance Marriott South Bay; Torrance, CA	TBD	Aaron Alexovich, Eric Trueheart, Jason Stiff, Jhonen Vasquez, Melissa Fahn, Richard Horvitz, Rikki Simons, Rodger Bumpass, & Wally Wingert
PinUpalooza	Pin-Up, Burlesque, & Rockabilly	October 6, 2012	International Palms Resort & Convention Center; Orlando, FL	TBD	TBD
WasabiCon	Geek Culture	October 27–28, 2012	Jacksonville Marriott; Jacksonville, FL	TBD	TBD
Florida Anime Experience 2013	Anime	May 24–26, 2013	International Palms Resort & Convention Center; Orlando, FL	TBD	TBD
