= Michel Lafon Publishing =

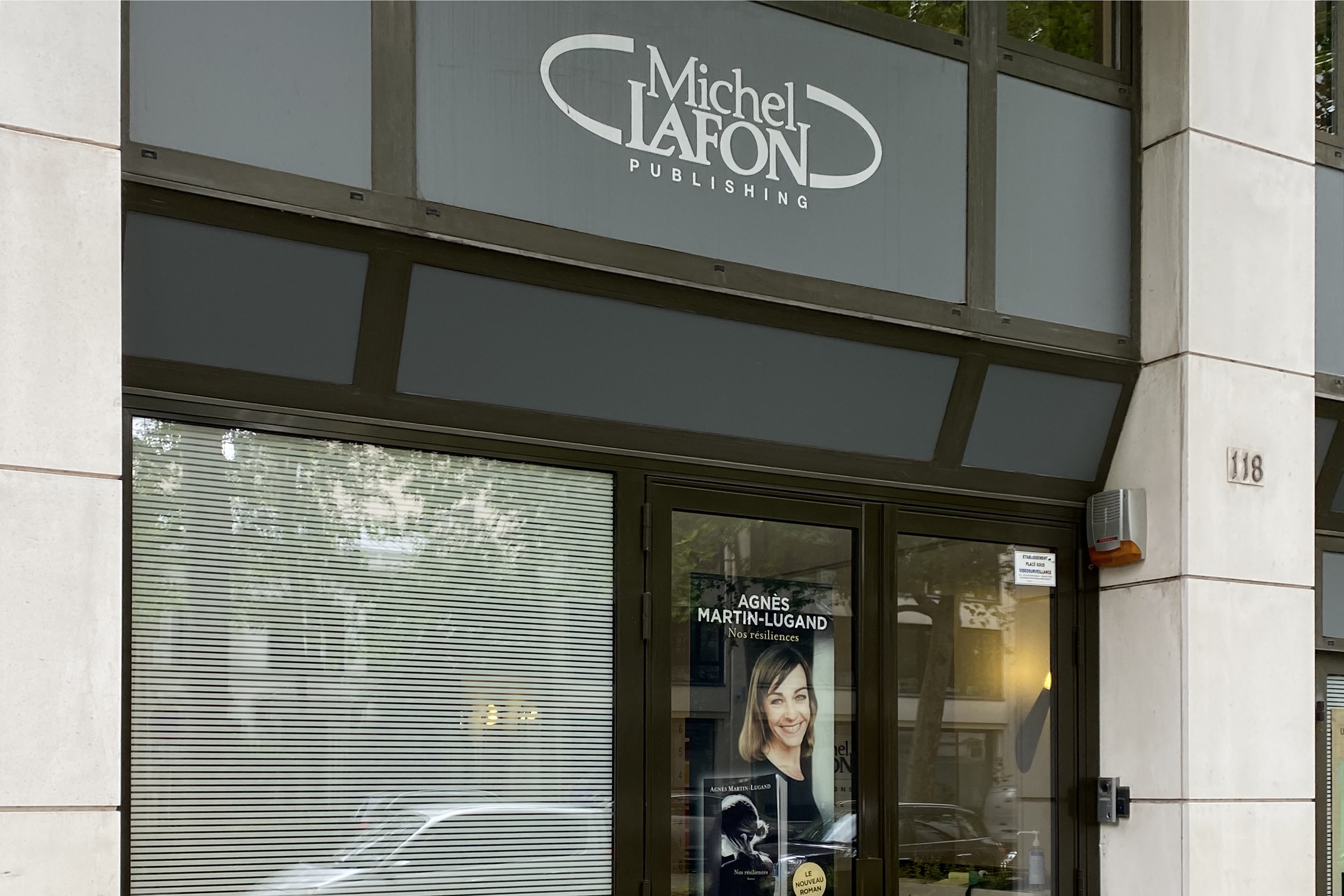
Michel Lafon Publishing

Michel Lafon Publishing (formerly Éditions Michel Lafon) is a French independent publishing house of fiction and non-fiction founded by Michel Lafon in 1980.

Originally launched to publish popular quality non-fiction, with a focus on memoirs, for the general market, it now publishes around 150 books a year across a wide range of subjects, including history, politics, current affairs, popular science and psychology, as well as literary and commercial fiction, crime fiction and suspense, illustrated books and graphic novels, and children's titles.

Among the writers on the Michel Lafon Publishing list are J. J. Abrams, Jay Asher, David Bowie, Geneviève Brisac, Didier van Cauwelaert, Madeleine Chapsal, Maxime Chattam, Chris Colfer, Patricia Darré, Catherine Deneuve, Lorànt Deutsch, Delphine de Vigan, Peter Falk, Maxence Fermine, Joy Fielding, Pink Floyd, Philippe de Gaulle, John Gray, Antoine Griezmann, Kristin Hannah, Marek Halter, Michael Jackson, Sébastien Loeb, Winnie Mandela, Agnès Martin-Lugand, Paul McCartney, Sarah McCoy, Olivier Norek, Thomas Pesquet, Jordan B. Peterson, Jodi Picoult, Marie-Claude Pietragalla, Anne Rice, Keith Richards, Anne Robillard, Tatiana de Rosnay, Joann Sfar, Peter Singer, L. J. Smith, Nicholas Sparks, Rod Stewart, Pete Townshend, Abdoulaye Wade, Zep, Anthony E. Zuiker.

== History ==
Michel Lafon, formerly a media entrepreneur and head of Hachette Presse Jeunesse, founded his publishing house in 1980.

A children and young adult department was launched in 2007, starting with The Knights of Emerald by Anne Robillard, a heroic fantasy series, of which four million copies have been sold to this day in France.

In 2010, Michel Lafon Éducation was set up with the support of UNESCO to develop a collection of schoolbooks for children in Africa.

A Canadian branch, Michel Lafon Canada, and a paperback imprint, Michel Lafon Poche, were launched in 2012.

In 2019, Éditions Michel Lafon, in partnership with France Inter, published the book adaptations of the Une histoire et… OLI podcast series showcasing the finest contemporary French authors.

Landmark titles include Maxime Chattam’s Trilogie du Mal, memoire Moi Nojoud, 10 ans, divorcée by Ali Nojoud and best-selling novel Les gens heureux lisent et boivent du café by Agnès Martin-Lugand, respectively translated in 35 and 34 languages.

Éditions Michel Lafon Publishing now publishes around 200 books a year, which are distributed by the Editis platform, Interforum in France, Belgium and Switzerland, and Messageries ADP in Canada.
