= Calimacil =

Canadian prop weapons manufacturer

Calimacil Probotik Inc.
- Industry: LARP products manufacturer
- Founded: December 23, 2003
- Founder: Patrick Lessard, CEO
- Headquarters: Sherbrooke, Quebec, Canada
- Key people: Christian Bédard, VP and Co-owner
- Website: calimacil.com

Calimacil Probotik inc. is a Canadian manufacturer located in Sherbrooke, Quebec. Founded in 2003 by Patrick Lessard, its name comes from an elven language created by author J. R. R. Tolkien: cali meaning light and macil meaning sword. This company specializes in the creation, manufacturing and distribution of foam weapons used in LARP, historical reenactment, movies and TV series.

Calimacil collaborates with many organizations and partners to develop weapons based on Heroic Fantasy themes, such as the ones from Amos Daragon, from Bryan Perro, which were created for summer camp Le Sanctuaire des Braves. The same applies to the fantasy novels Knights of Emerald, written by Anne Robillard, and the Seyrawyn book series, written by Martial Grisé.

In 2015, Calimacil used the crowdfunding site Kickstarter to begin its project of a Foam LED Saber. Successfully funded on December 3, 2015, this campaign makes it possible for Calimacil to reach a wider audience, and to integrate electronics into its foam weapons.

Design and production of the weapons is made in their Sherbrooke workshop. Their products go through a molding process using historical of fantasy weapons as inspiration. The production process starts by the injection of a special foam around a rigid polymer or carbon core. Calimacil has some points of sale throughout the world and distributes its products in more than 12 countries.

Calimacil has four business segments: Live action role-playing gear, the entertainment industry, replica gear, and the new electronic product, CaliMotion, which is mainly used in the LEDSaber, Calimacil version of the lightsaber.

In 2017, Calimacil tripled its workshop size to meet global demand for its products. This expansion project is valued at $1 million.
