= Marie-Claude Bourbonnais =

Canadian glamour and cosplay model

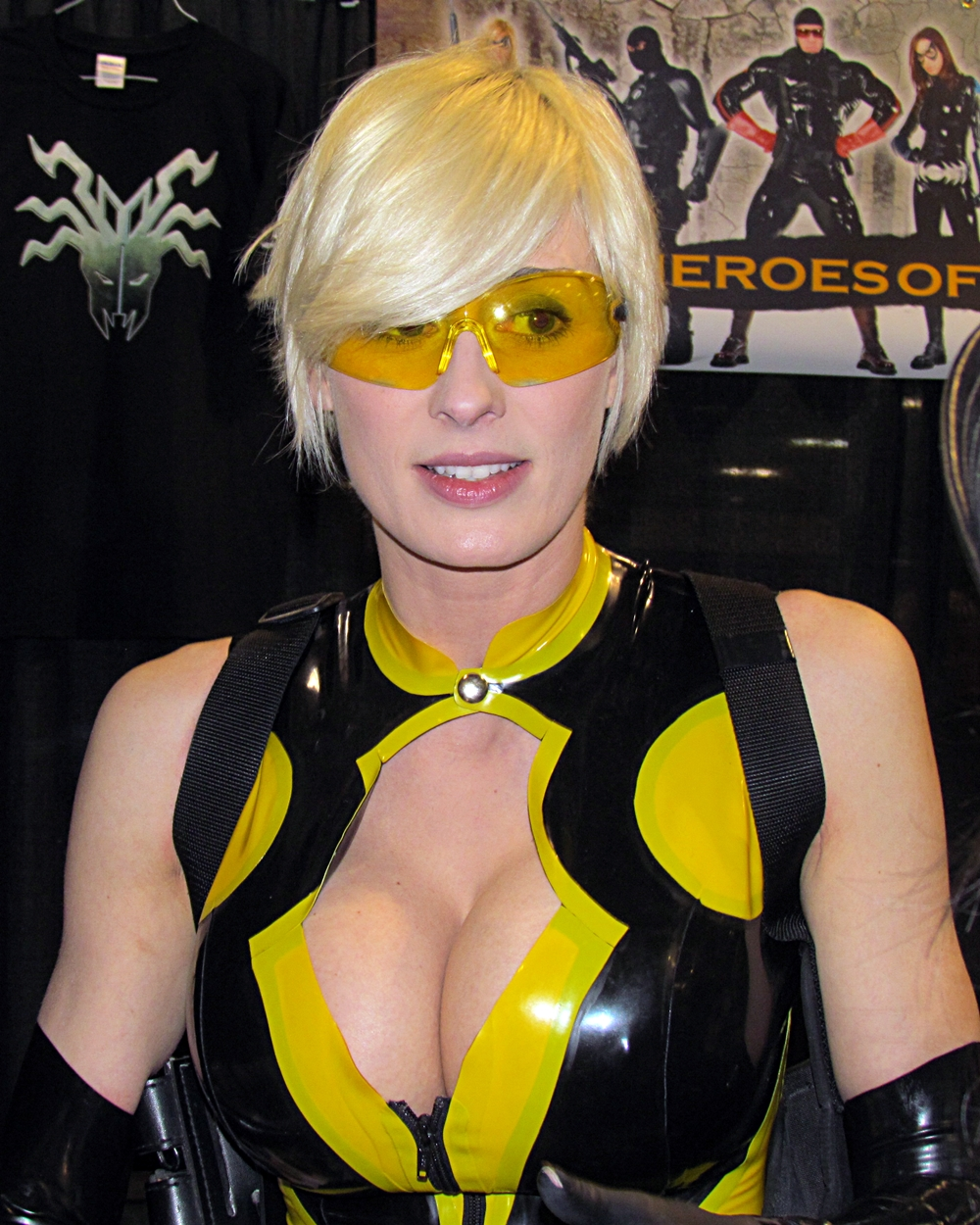
- Marie-Claude Bourbonnais at the 2012 Calgary Comic and Entertainment Expo
- Born: October 15, 1979 (age 46); Sainte-Anne-de-la-Pocatière, Quebec, Canada
- Occupations: Glamour and cosplay model
- Modeling information
- Height: 5 ft 7 in (1.70 m)
- Hair color: Brunette
- Eye color: Green
- Website: MCBourbonnais.com

Marie-Claude Bourbonnais (French pronunciation: [maʁi klod buʁbɔnɛ]; born October 15, 1979, in Sainte-Anne-de-la-Pocatière) is a Canadian glamour and cosplay model.

== Career ==
Bourbonnais had worked as a costumer and fashion designer before she began her professional modeling career when she posed for the 2008 calendar Dream Team, sponsored by RadioX and Molson Export. In July 2008, she posed in an advertising campaign for New York Fries, a Canadian franchise fast-food restaurant. Bourbonnais continued to model, including for American Curves, Elle Canada, FHM Philippines, People, PlayStation Official Magazine, Summum and Toronto Sun, as well as for charity purposes. In 2010, she started her own company. Bourbonnais has also been cosplay modeling and creating costumes since 2009, including participating in a 2011 calendar Cosplay for a Cause raising funds for the Japanese earthquake and tsunami relief.

Bourbonnais was a speaker at Anime Weekend Atlanta 2012, and a special guest at several North and South American conventions including Cape & Kimono 2010 and 2011, Ottawa Comiccon 2012, Nadeshicon 2014, Comiccon de Québec 2014, Montreal Comiccon 2014, and Comiccon de Québec 2015. She was featured on radio and TV shows, and Soda Pop Miniatures and Paolo Parente featured her as a character in their games. She also played the character Hornet in the web series Heroes of the North that has an action figure made in her image.
