= Anime Festival Orlando =

Anime convention in the United States

Coordinates: 28°25′37″N 81°28′1″W

- Logo
- Status: Active
- Venue: Hyatt Regency Orlando
- Location: Orlando, Florida
- Country: United States
- Inaugurated: August 19, 2000; 26 years ago
- Website: http://www.animefestivalorlando.com/

Anime Festival Orlando (AFO) is an annual three-day anime convention held during June/July at the Hyatt Regency Orlando in Orlando, Florida.

== Programming ==
The convention typically offers an Artist Alley, cosplay contents, maid cafe, panels, rave, vendors, and a video game room. An interactive game "Tales of Orlandia" occurs during the convention. The convention's charity event in 2009 benefited Child's Play.

== History ==
The conventions organization began in December 1999. AFO shared space with another convention hosting Governor Jeb Bush in 2006. Anime Festival Orlando 2020 was moved from June to November due to the COVID-19 pandemic, but was later cancelled. Anime Festival Orlando was also cancelled in 2021 due to the COVID-19 pandemic.

=== Event history ===
Dates	Location	Atten.	Guests
August 19–20, 2000	Ramada Plaza Hotel and Inn Gateway; Kissimmee, Florida	450	Steve Bennett, Marshall Hash, and Wendee Lee.
July 27–29, 2001	Hilton Orlando/Altamonte Springs; Altamonte Springs, Florida	1,000	Steve Bennett, Chynna Clugston-Major, Marshall Hash, Wendee Lee, Doug Smith, and Yoshiki Tokushu.
August 16–18, 2002	Renaissance WorldGate; Kissimmee, Florida		Hiroshi Aro, Steve Bennett, Keith Burgess, Lindsay Cibos, Chynna Clugston-Major, Robert DeJesus, Ben Dunn, Marshall Hash, Jared Hodges, Wendee Lee, Jan Scott-Frazier, Doug Smith, Miyuki Sugimori, and Yoshiki Tokushu.
August 1–3, 2003	Wyndham Orlando Resort; Orlando, Florida		Steve Bennett, Lindsay Cibos, Robert DeJesus, Tiffany Grant, Jared Hodges, Wendee Lee, Chris Patton, Meredith Placko, Jack Povlitz, and Jan Scott-Frazier.
August 6–8, 2004	Wyndham Orlando Resort; Orlando, Florida		Steve Bennett, Sandy Fox, Lex Lang, Trish Ledoux, Wendee Lee, Meredith Placko, Jan Scott-Frazier, Doug Smith, and Toshifumi Yoshida.
August 5–7, 2005	Wyndham Orlando Resort; Orlando, Florida		Tom Bateman, Steve Bennett, Bob Bergen, Michael Dobson, Sandy Fox, Lex Lang, Tony Oliver, Christopher Sabat, Jan Scott-Frazier, Doug Smith, and Steve Yun.
July 28–30, 2006	Wyndham Orlando Resort; Orlando, Florida		Lindsay Cibos, Aaron Dismuke, Quinton Flynn, Marc Handler, Jared Hodges, Vic Mignogna, Jeff Nimoy, Christopher Sabat, Doug Smith, Veronica Taylor, and Travis Willingham.
August 3–5, 2007	Wyndham Orlando Resort; Orlando, Florida		Lindsay Cibos, Colleen Clinkenbeard, Jason David Frank, Marc Handler, Jared Hodges, Christopher Sabat, Doug Smith, Sonny Strait, and Travis Willingham.
August 15–17, 2008	Wyndham Orlando Resort; Orlando, Florida		Colleen Clinkenbeard, Aaron Dismuke, Richard Epcar, Jason David Frank, Reuben Langdon, Chris Patton, Monica Rial, Doug Smith, Ellyn Stern, Travis Willingham, and Stephanie Yanez.
July 31 – August 2, 2009	Wyndham Orlando Resort; Orlando, Florida		Robert Axelrod, Colleen Clinkenbeard, Aaron Dismuke, Jason David Frank, Reuben Langdon, Vic Mignogna, Christopher Sabat, Doug Smith, and Sonny Strait.
August 5–8, 2010	Wyndham Orlando Resort; Orlando, Florida		Jason David Frank, Reuben Langdon, Tony Oliver, Daniel Southworth, Sonny Strait, Jessica Straus, David Yost, and Tommy Yune.
August 4–7, 2011	Wyndham Orlando Resort; Orlando, Florida		Johnny Yong Bosch, Quinton Flynn, Blake Anthony Foster, Jason David Frank, Reuben Langdon, Wendee Lee, Dan Southworth, John Swasey, and Cristina Vee.
August 3–5, 2012	Wyndham Orlando Resort; Orlando, Florida		Grey DeLisle, D. C. Douglas, Richard Epcar, Jason David Frank, Kyle Hebert, Jason Narvy, Dan Southworth, Ellyn Stern, Sonny Strait, and Tara Strong.
August 16–18, 2013	Renaissance Orlando at SeaWorld; Orlando, Florida		Debi Derryberry, D.C. Douglas, Final Weapon, Jennifer Hale, HDninja, Ali Hillis, Jason Narvy, Tony Oliver, Bryce Papenbrook, Random Encounter, Rino Romano, S.S. Hanami, Paul Schrier, Stephanie Sheh, and Michael Sinterniklaas.
July 25–27, 2014	Wyndham Orlando Resort; Orlando, Florida		Lucien Dodge, Reuben Langdon, Erica Mendez, Sean Schemmel, Stephanie Sheh, Cristina Vee, and Kari Wahlgren.
August 14–16, 2015	Wyndham Orlando Resort; Orlando, Florida		Dante Basco, Todd Haberkorn, Reuben Langdon, Eric Stuart, and Veronica Taylor.
July 29–31, 2016	Wyndham Orlando Resort; Orlando, Florida		Gregg Berger, Richie Branson, Aaron Dismuke, Todd Haberkorn, Reuben Langdon, Vic Mignogna, Mark Musashi, Stephanie Sheh, Michael Sinterniklaas, and John Swasey.
June 9–11, 2017	Wyndham Orlando Resort; Orlando, Florida		Robert Axelrod, Bruce Carr, Barbara Dunkelman, Caitlin Glass, Kazha, Josh Keaton, Reuben Langdon, and Arryn Zech.
August 3–5, 2018	Wyndham Orlando Resort International Drive; Orlando, Florida		Bruce Carr, Colleen Clinkenbeard, Dorah Fine, Reuben Langdon, and John Swasey.
August 9–11, 2019	Wyndham Orlando Resort International Drive; Orlando, Florida		Steve Blum, Johnny Yong Bosch, Dorah Fine, Jason David Frank, Billy Kametz, Reuben Langdon, Mary Elizabeth McGlynn, Mega Ran, Tony Oliver, and Dan Southworth.
June 24–26, 2022	Wyndham Orlando Resort International Drive; Orlando, Florida		Doug Cockle, Dorah Fine, Kyle Hebert, Jeremy Inman, Brittney Karbowski, Kazha, Christina Marie Kelly, Aaron Pabon, Aaron Roberts, John Swasey, and Howard Wang.
June 16–18, 2023	Wyndham Orlando Resort International Drive; Orlando, Florida		Azazus, Aaron Campbell, CRH Productions, Richard Epcar, Chuck Huber, Jennie Kwan, Cricket Leigh, Monica May, Tony Oliver, Rhythm Bastard, Ellyn Stern, and Chuck Stroschein.
June 28–30, 2024	Rosen Plaza; Orlando, Florida		AKrCos, Azazus, Dante Basco, Johnny Yong Bosch, Kira Buckland, Tiana Camacho, SungWon Cho, CRH Productions, Brittany Lauda, and Howard Wang.
June 20–22, 2025	Rosen Plaza; Orlando, Florida		Bryson Baugus, Abigail Blythe, Ricco Fajardo, Feycrafts, Barbara Goodson, Gabe Kunda, Lex Lang, Mega Ran, Oriana Perón, and Matt Shipman.
June 19-21, 2026	Rosen Plaza; Orlando, Florida		Aaron Campbell, Jordan Dash Cruz, Aaron Dismuke, River Glass, Chris Guerrero, Jill Harris, Gabe Kunda, Daman Mills, and Tony Oliver.
July 16-18, 2027	Hyatt Regency Orlando; Orlando, Florida		Todd Haberkorn, Jill Harris, Dallas Reid, and Corey Wilder.

== Gallery ==
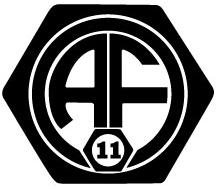
Logo for Anime Festival Orlando 11 (2010)
