= Ottawa Comiccon =

Multi-genre fan convention in Ottawa, Canada

- Status: Active
- Venue: Cohere Centre (2012 - )
- Locations: Ottawa, Ontario
- Country: Canada
- Inaugurated: 2012
- Attendance: 42,000 (May 2017 edition)
- Organizer: Capeflow Productions
- Website: http://www.ottawacomiccon.com

The Ottawa Comiccon is a fan convention with a focus on comics, sci-fi, horror, anime, and games. It is a spin-off of the Montreal Comiccon. It was launched in 2012. The event features comic books, toys, games, science-fiction, horror, anime, non-sport cards, and collectibles. It is held at the EY Centre convention centre in Ottawa, taking place in May and lasting three days. The organizers of the Ottawa Comiccon primarily come from the Montreal Comiccon organization.

The event features special guests, artists, exhibitors and special contests. The audience includes people of all ages. The first edition, in 2012, featured guests such as William Shatner (of Star Trek), and other special guests.

The fan convention contains multi-genre content. While sharing common traits with San Diego Comic-Con and Toronto's Fan Expo Canada, the Ottawa Comiccon differentiates itself by being a much smaller venue.

== Programming ==
As with most other comics conventions, the Ottawa Comiccon offers a select range of activities, exhibits, and other attractions. Comiccon's programming consists of a large dealers' area, an Artists' Alley, a costume contest, a trading-card games area and guest panels. Guest photo sessions, Masquerade, and structured autograph line-up barriers have been in place since the first edition.

== History ==
The Ottawa Comiccon held its first edition in 2012 at the EY Centre. The event lasted 2 days and attracted 22,000 people.

The second edition in May 2013 saw the addition of a day to the schedule, extending the event from Friday to Sunday. The May 2013 edition attracted more than 30,000 fans.

The third edition, in May 2014, attracted 38,000 people over a three-day period. The floor setup was changed to better accommodate the autograph and photo ops line-up.

The sixth edition, in May 2017, moved the food court outside under a tent to free space within the conference centre for booths and exhibits. A new event, "All Roads Lead to Rome" was added, also under a tent outside. The event added gladiatorial combat, gladiator training for ComicCon attendees, and candle making.

As with the Montreal Comiccon, the organizers also run a smaller two-day convention in November–December called the "Ottawa Pop Expo". The first edition of the Expo was held on the December 7th weekend at the EY Centre. It offered a smaller selection of guests, dealers and artists. The organizational structure remained the same as the May edition, but with slightly fewer staff and volunteers. In 2016 the Ottawa Pop Expo event was renamed the "Ottawa Comiccon: Holiday Edition", with free entry, and was described as "two-day geeky shopping celebration." The event focused exclusively on purchasable content, with no media guests.

=== Dates and locations ===
Note: Only May editions are shown here.

Dates	Location	Attendance (turnstile)	Notable guests	Notes
May 12–13, 2012	EY Centre; Ottawa, Ontario	22,000	Marie-Claude Bourbonnais (fashion designer / cosplayer), Jeremy Bulloch (Star Wars), John de Lancie (STNG), Lar DeSouza (web comic artist, Least I Could Do), Lee Ann Farruga (steampunk costumer), Lou Ferrigno (The Incredible Hulk), Brent Spiner (STNG), Vic Mignogna (voice actor), Cassandra Peterson (Elvira), Ryan Sohmer (web comic writer, Least I Could Do), Patrick Stewart (STNG, X-Men) (cancelled), William Shatner (Star Trek)	First edition.
May 10 to 12, 2013	EY Centre; Ottawa, Ontario	30, 000	Adam West (Batman) (cancelled), Burt Ward (Batman), Julie Newmar (Batman). Manu Bennet (Arrow), Billy Dee Williams (Star Wars, Batman), David Prowse (Star Wars), Summer Glau (Firefly) (cancelled), Nathan Fillion (Firefly), Jewel Staite (Firefly), James Marsters (Buffy the Vampire Slayer), Gillian Anderson (X-Files), Will Weaton (STNG, Big Bang), Levar Burton (STNG)	...
May 9 to 11, 2014	EY Centre; Ottawa, Ontario	38,000	Christopher Lloyd, Robert Englund, Bruce Campbell, Amanda Tapping, Edward James Olmos, Eliza Dushku (cancelled), Giancarlo Esposito, Karl Urban, Pat Mastroianni, Summer Glau, Charisma Carpenter, Ray Park, Sean Astin, Christopher Judge, Kane Hodder, Amanda Wyss	Leonard Nimoy made a rare appearance via Skype on May 10.
May 8 to 10, 2015	EY Centre; Ottawa, Ontario	42,000	Wil Wheaton (STNG, Big Bang), Peter Mayhew (Star Wars), Jason Mewes (Clerks), Billy Boyd (LOTR), Jonathan Frakes (STNG), Lance Henrikson (Aliens, Terminator), Malcolm McDowell (Clockwork Orange, Star Trek Generations), Marina Sirtis (STNG), Nichelle Nichols (Star Trek), Sean Maher (Firefly), Robbie Amell (Flash), Paul Wesley (Vampire Diaries), Richard Dean Anderson (Stargate), Mira Furlan (Babylon 5), Billie Piper (Dr. Who), Allison Mack (Smallville), Liam McIntyre (Spartacus), Austin St. John (Power Rangers)	...
May 13 to 15, 2016	EY Centre; Ottawa, Ontario	42,000	Guests of Honor: Karen Gillan (Doctor Who), Ming-Na Wen (Agents Of S.H.I.E.L.D.) Featured Guests: Alan Tudyk (Firefly), Arthur Darvill (Doctor Who, Legends of Tomorrow), Billy Dee Williams (Star Wars: The Empire Strikes Back), Caity Lotz (Arrow, Legends of Tomorrow), Carl Weathers (Rocky, Predator), Eliza Dushku (Buffy The Vampire Slayer), James O'Barr (The Crow), John de Lancie (STNG), John-Rhys Davies (LOTR), Kevin Eastman (Teenage Mutant Ninja Turtles), Lou Ferrigno (The Incredible Hulk), Mike Grell (Green Arrow / Green Lantern), Rene Auberjonois (Star Trek: Deep Space Nine), Sean Astin (LOTR), Tia Carrere (Relic Hunter), Whilce Portacio (Image Comics Co-Founder), Will Friedle (Batman Beyond) Other Guests: Dan Parent (Archie Comics), Dave Ross (Avengers: West Coast), Eric Talbot (Teenage Mutant Ninja Turtles), Fernando Ruiz (Life with Archie), Janet Hetherington (Elvira: Mistress of the Dark), Kristen Hughey (Cosplayer), Monika Lee (Cosplayer), Riki "Riddle" LeCotey (Cosplayer), Robert Bailey (Star Wars), Ronn Sutton (Honey West / Kolchak the Night Stalker), Tom Fowler (Venom)	First Edition not on Mother's Day weekend
May 12 to 14, 2017	EY Centre Ottawa, Ontario	42,000+	Guests of Honour: Adam West (Batman, Family Guy)(Cancelled), John Barrowman (Arrow, Doctor Who), Peter Capaldi (Doctor Who) Featured Guests: Alex Kingston (Doctor Who), Arryn Zech (RWBY), Bob Layton (Iron Man), Bob Morley (The 100), Brent Spiner (Star Trek: The Next Generation), Brian Froud (Total Drama Island), Clare Kramer (Buffy The Vampire Slayer), Dan Parent (Archie Comics), Gates McFadden (Star Trek: The Next Generation), George A. Romero (Night of the Living Dead), Indra Rojas (Cosplayer), Jenna Coleman (Doctor Who), John Tench (Watch Dogs 2), Johnathan Dubsky (Watch Dogs 2), Ken Lashley (X-Men Prime), Kirsten Bourne (Degrassi High), Laura Vandervoort (Bitten, Smallville), Madelaine Petsch (Riverdale), Matthew Lewis (Harry Potter), Michael Golden (Bucky O'Hare, Micronauts), Mike Zeck (The Punisher), Nick Bradshaw (Guardians Of The Galaxy), Pat Mastroianni (Degrassi High), Phil LaMarr (Futurama), Robin Lord Taylor (Gotham), Shawn Baichoo (Watch Dogs 2), Stacie Mistysyn (Degrassi High), Stefan Brogren (Degrassi High), Traci Lords (Cry Baby, Zack and Miri) Other Guests: '67 Impala (Supernatural), Capital City Garrison, Doctor Who Society of Canada, Double Experience, Fernando Ruiz (Life with Archie), Greg Hyland (The LEGO Group), Ireland Reid (Cosplayer), Jack Brigilo (Growing Up Enchanted), Jamie Tyndall (Grimm Fairy Tales), Janet Hetherington (Elvira: Mistress of the Dark), Jason Rockman (Spokesperson), Jeep 12 (Jurassic Park), John Torres (Twitch streamer), K.I.T.T. (Knight Rider), Karibu (Survivorland), Marco Rudy (Marvel Knights: Spider-Man), Renee Witterstaetter (Excess: The Art of Michael Golden), Richard Pace (New Warriors), Ronn Sutton (Honey West, Kolchak the Night Stalker), The 1966 Batmobile (Batman), Tom Fowler (Rick And Morty), Troy Little (Chiaroscuro), Ty Templeton (The Batman & Robin Adventures)	
May 11 to 13, 2018	EY Centre Ottawa, Ontario	40,000+	Guests of Honour: Jason Momoa (Aquaman), Matt Smith (Doctor Who) (The Crown) Featured Guests: Billy Boyd (The Lord of the Rings), Doug Jones (actor) (The Shape of Water) (Star Trek: Discovery), Joonas Suotamo (Solo: A Star Wars Story), Laurie Holden (The Walking Dead), Megan Follows (Anne of Green Gables). Other Guests: To be announced	
May 10 to 12, 2019	EY Centre Ottawa, Ontario	42,000+	Sean Astin - Actor John Barrowman - Actor Cancelled Tom Cavanagh - Actor Kevin Conroy - Voice Actor Tom Felton - Actor Cancelled Mike Grell - Comic Artist / Writer Yaya Han - Cosplayer Geof Isherwood - Comic Artist Amy Jo Johnson - Actor Pom Klementieff - Actor Gisèle Lagacé - Web Comic Artist David Lloyd - Artist MeltingMirror - Cosplayer Dan Parent - Comic Artist & Writer Ron Perlman - Actor Sean Schemmel - Actor Mark Sheppard - Actor Joonas Suotamo - Actor Arthur Suydam - Comic Artist Catherine Tate - Actor Tom Welling - Actor Renee Witterstaetter - Editor / Colorist Mike Zeck - Artist	

== See also ==
- List of comic book conventions
