= Anime Weekend Atlanta =

Annual anime convention in Georgia, United States

Coordinates: 33.758652°N 84.39841°W

- Status: Active
- Genre: Anime, manga
- Venue: Georgia World Congress Center, Building C
- Location: Atlanta, Georgia
- Country: United States
- Inaugurated: 1995
- Attendance: 34,000 (est.) in 2023
- Organizer: AWA LLC
- Website: awa-con.com

Anime Weekend Atlanta (AWA) is an annual four-day anime convention held during December at the Georgia World Congress Center, Building C in Atlanta, Georgia.

== Programming ==
The convention typically offers an Anime Music Video contest, Artists' Alley, car show, concerts, costume contest, dances, Dealer's Room, fashion show, formal ball, game shows, idol festival, karaoke, Maid Cafe, panels, RPG Gaming, tabletop gaming, Video Gaming, and Workshops. Anime Weekend Atlanta during the convention has 24-hour programming.

== History ==
The Anime Music Video contest in 2001 had 200 plus entries. The AMV contest in 2003 took over three hours and had 300 plus entries. The Dealer's Room took up 72,000 square feet in 2007. Cartoon Network announced the end of its Toonami block during a panel at Anime Weekend Atlanta 2008. Loverin Tamburin could not enter the United States for their 2015 appearance due to visa issues. Anime Weekend Atlanta 2020 was cancelled due to the COVID-19 pandemic. An online event was later held from December 18–20, 2020. Anime Weekend Atlanta in 2021 had both a mask mandate and vaccination/testing policy. The convention also occurred during the 2021 World Series, causing local traffic concerns. Anime Weekend Atlanta moved to the Georgia World Congress Center in 2024 and was in December. Vendor space was also greatly expanded.

=== Event history ===
Dates	Location	Atten.	Guests
October 27–29, 1995	Castlegate Hotel & Conference Center; Atlanta, Georgia		Ed Hill, Bruce Lewis, Bill Mayo, and Vaughan Simmons.
October 11–13, 1996	Holiday Inn Atlanta Airport North; Atlanta, Georgia		Steve Bennett, Bruce Lewis, Bill Mayo, Neil Nadelman, and Robert Woodhead.
November 14–16, 1997	Atlanta Marriott North Central; Atlanta, Georgia	1,350	Steve Bennett, Ed Hill, Carl Gustav Horn, Amy Howard-Wilson, Bruce Lewis, Bill Mayo, Neil Nadelman, and Robert Woodhead.
October 9–11, 1998	Atlanta Marriott North Central; Atlanta, Georgia	1,400	Ippongi Bang, Steve Bennett, Michael Brady, Juliet Cesario, Tim Eldred, Ed Hill, Carl Gustav Horn, Scott Houle, Amy Howard-Wilson, Shimpei Itoh, Kuni Kimura, Bruce Lewis, Bill Mayo, Neil Nadelman, Mio Odagi, Rikki Simons, Scott Simpson, Toren Smith, Tavisha Wolfgarth-Simons, and Robert Woodhead.
October 8–10, 1999	Atlanta Marriott Gwinnett Place; Duluth, Georgia	2,000	Ippongi Bang, Steve Bennett, Michael Brady, Jessica Calvello, C. Martin Croker, Peter Fernandez, Tiffany Grant, Ed Hill, Amy Howard-Wilson, Mari Iijima, Shimpei Itoh, Bruce Lewis, George Lowe, Mio Odagi, Tom Tweedy, and Brett Weaver.
October 6–8, 2000	Crowne Plaza-Atlanta Ravinia; Dunwoody, Georgia	2,700	Steve Bennett, Michael Brady, Jessica Calvello, C. Martin Croker, Tim Eldred, Peter Fernandez, Tiffany Grant, Ed Hill, Carl Gustav Horn, Amy Howard-Wilson, Bruce Lewis, Shaindle Minuk, Neil Nadelman, Corinne Orr, Lisa Ortiz, and Brett Weaver.
September 21–23, 2001	Sheraton Gateway Hotel Atlanta Airport; Georgia International Convention Center; College Park, Georgia	3,150	Jonathan Clements, Jason Douglas, Nickey Froberg, Tiffany Grant, Amy Howard-Wilson, and Brett Weaver.
September 27–29, 2002	Sheraton Gateway Hotel Atlanta Airport; Georgia International Convention Center; College Park, Georgia		Steve Bennett, Robert DeJesus, Tim Eldred, Peter Fernandez, Nickey Froberg, Matt Greenfield, Amy Howard-Wilson, Bruce Lewis, Kelly Manison, Corinne Orr, Monica Rial, Jan Scott-Frazier, John Sirabella, Doug Smith, Kira Vincent-Davis, Brett Weaver, and David L. Williams.
September 26–28, 2003	Renaissance Waverly Hotel; Cobb Galleria Centre; Atlanta, Georgia	4,584	Steve Bennett, Jo Chen, Kelli Cousins, Robert DeJesus, Tim Eldred, Peter Fernandez, Nickey Froberg, Carl Gustav Horn, Amy Howard-Wilson, Allison Keith-Shipp, Hiroyuki Kitakubo, Fred Ladd, Bruce Lewis, Jason Martin, Neil Nadelman, Toshio Okada, Corinne Orr, Monica Rial, Jan Scott-Frazier, Rikki Simons, Doug Smith, Kira Vincent-Davis, Brett Weaver, David L. Williams, and Tavisha Wolfgarth-Simons.
September 24–26, 2004	Renaissance Waverly Hotel; Cobb Galleria Centre; Atlanta, Georgia	5,837	Christine Auten, Jonathan Clements, Emily DeJesus, Robert DeJesus, Fred Gallagher, Lauren Goodnight, Carl Gustav Horn, Amy Howard-Wilson, Mari Iijima, Patrick Macias, Helen McCarthy, Vic Mignogna, Neil Nadelman, Fred Patten, Stephanie Sheh, Kari Wahlgren, David L. Williams, and Larissa Wolcott.
September 23–25, 2005	Renaissance Waverly Hotel; Cobb Galleria Centre; Atlanta, Georgia	7,505	Greg Ayres, Jessica Boone, Emily DeJesus, Robert DeJesus, Tim Eldred, Lisa Furukawa, Lauren Goodnight, Ed Hill, Carl Gustav Horn, Yoko Ishida, Vic Mignogna, Neil Nadelman, Mariela Ortiz, Peelander-Z, Fred Perry, Stan Sakai, Select Start, Rikki Simons, Michael Sinterniklaas, David L. Williams, and Tavisha Wolfgarth-Simons.
September 22–24, 2006	Renaissance Waverly Hotel; Cobb Galleria Centre; Atlanta, Georgia	8,949	Masahiro Aizawa, Keitaro Arima, Luci Christian, Emily DeJesus, Robert DeJesus, Lauren Goodnight, Carl Gustav Horn, Amy Howard-Wilson, Vic Mignogna, Neil Nadelman. Sasha Paysinger, Fred Perry, Monica Rial, Stephanie Sheh, Michael Sinterniklaas, TsuShiMaMiRe, David L. Williams, and Travis Willingham.
September 21–23, 2007	Renaissance Waverly Hotel; Cobb Galleria Centre; Atlanta, Georgia	10,200	Greg Ayres, The Captains, Colleen Clinkenbeard, Emily DeJesus, Robert DeJesus, The Emeralds, Lauren Goodnight, Carl Gustav Horn, Amy Howard-Wilson, Noboru Ishiguro, Mike McFarland, Vic Mignogna, Neil Nadelman, Peelander-Z, Monica Rial, Rikki Simons, Barbara Staples, David L. Williams, and Tavisha Wolfgarth-Simons.
September 19–21, 2008	Renaissance Waverly Hotel; Cobb Galleria Centre; Atlanta, Georgia	11,101	Jennie Breeden, The Captains, Ashley Clark, Camilla d'Errico, Emily DeJesus, Robert DeJesus, The Emeralds, Peter Fernandez, Illich Guardiola, Yaya Han, Carl Gustav Horn, Amy Howard-Wilson, Patrick Macias, Vic Mignogna, Neil Nadelman, Corinne Orr, Peelander-Z, Fred Perry, PikaBelleChu, Monica Rial, Rikki Simons, Barbara Staples, Jonathan Tarbox, TsuShiMaMiRe, David L. Williams, Travis Willingham, David G. Wilson III, Tavisha Wolfgarth-Simons, and Toshifumi Yoshida.
September 18–20, 2009	Renaissance Waverly Hotel; Cobb Galleria Centre; Atlanta, Georgia	11,717	Amazon Mandy, Troy Baker, Jennie Breeden, Ashley Clark, Camilla d'Errico, Emily DeJesus, Robert DeJesus, Tim Eldred, Caitlin Glass, Yaya Han, Carl Gustav Horn, Amy Howard-Wilson, Samantha Inoue-Harte, Helen McCarthy, Vic Mignogna, Misako Rocks!, Neil Nadelman, Omodaka, Outland Armour, Peelander-Z, PikaBelleChu, Rikki Simons, Jonathan Tarbox, David L. Williams, David G. Wilson III, and Tavisha Wolfgarth-Simons.
September 17–19, 2010	Renaissance Waverly Hotel; Cobb Galleria Centre; Atlanta, Georgia	12,718	Shinji Aramaki, Laura Bailey, Jennie Breeden, Tim Eldred, Yaya Han, Carl Gustav Horn, Amy Howard-Wilson, Samantha Inoue-Harte, Helen McCarthy, Vic Mignogna, Neil Nadelman, Lisa Ortiz, Rikki Simons, Michael Sinterniklaas, Jonathan Tarbox, David L. Williams, Travis Willingham, David G. Wilson III, Tavisha Wolfgarth-Simons.
September 30-October 2, 2011	Renaissance Waverly Hotel; Cobb Galleria Centre; Atlanta, Georgia	12,499	Yoshitoshi ABe, Emily DeJesus, Robert DeJesus, Tim Eldred, Todd Haberkorn, Carl Gustav Horn, Amy Howard-Wilson, Naoko Matsui, Vic Mignogna, Moon Stream, Neil Nadelman, Brina Palencia, Doug Smith, The Suzan, David L. Williams, David G. Wilson III, and Steve Yun.
September 28–30, 2012	Renaissance Waverly Hotel; Cobb Galleria Centre; Atlanta, Georgia	13,472	Johnny Yong Bosch, Marie-Claude Bourbonnais, Jennie Breeden, Ed Chavez, Tim Eldred, Eyeshine, Yaya Han, heidi., Naoto Hirooka, Ryo Horikawa, Carl Gustav Horn, Amy Howard-Wilson, You Kikkawa, Ayumi Kino, Vic Mignogna, Suzuko Mimori, Neil Nadelman, Trina Nishimura, Frederik L. Schodt, and David L. Williams.
September 27–29, 2013	Renaissance Waverly Hotel; Cobb Galleria Centre; Sheraton Suites Galleria; Atlanta, Georgia	18,363	Akino, Yuu Asakawa, bless4, Jennie Breeden, Tim Eldred, Toshio Furukawa, Todd Haberkorn, Shunsuke Hasegawa, Carl Gustav Horn, Amy Howard-Wilson, Mitsuo Iwata, Vic Mignogna, Christopher "moot" Poole, Christopher Sabat, Lisle Wilkerson, and David L. Williams.
September 26–28, 2014	Renaissance Waverly Hotel; Cobb Galleria Centre; Sheraton Suites Galleria; Atlanta, Georgia	20,311	Toru Furuya, Yaya Han, Home Made Kazoku, Masumi Kano, Cherami Leigh, Loverin Tamburin, Scott McNeil, Vic Mignogna, Yūko Minaguchi, MIQ, Bryce Papenbrook, Svetlana Quindt, Shonen Knife, Junichi Suwabe, and J. Michael Tatum.
September 24–27, 2015	Renaissance Waverly Hotel; Cobb Galleria Centre; Sheraton Suites Galleria; Atlanta, Georgia	25,107	Eir Aoi, Curtis Arnott, Linda Ballantyne, Fhána, Scott Frerichs, heidi., HigeDriver, K-ble Jungle, Kato*Fuku, Nick Landis, Loverin Tamburin, Cassandra Lee Morris, Neeko, Toby Proctor, Reika, Christopher Sabat, Daisuke Sakaguchi, Stephanie Sheh, Michael Sinterniklaas, Kaiji Tang, Luna Tsukigami, Universe, Lisle Wilkerson, Mengo Yokoyari, and Yuyoyuppe.
September 29 - October 2, 2016	Renaissance Waverly Hotel; Cobb Galleria Centre; Atlanta, Georgia	28,781	Zach Aguilar, Curtis Arnott, Johnny Yong Bosch, Ray Chase, Robbie Daymond, Eyeshine, Sandy Fox, Scott Frerichs, GARNiDELiA, Todd Haberkorn, DJ HeavyGrinder, Joe Inoue, Jin-Machine, karory, Erik Scott Kimerer, Lex Lang, Matthew Lassiter, Riki "Riddle" LeCotey, Masaya Matsukaze, Vic Mignogna, Max Mittelman, Manabu Ono, Jez Roth, Chinatsu Taira, Soichiro Umemoto, Vedetta Marie, Sarah Anne Williams, and Yutaka Yamamoto.
September 28 - October 1, 2017	Renaissance Waverly Hotel; Cobb Galleria Centre; Atlanta, Georgia	31,500 (est.)	AllieCat, Laura Bailey, Kay Bear, Bea Billany, Christine Marie Cabanos, Nobutoshi Canna, Andy Field, Kellen Goff, Jennifer Hale, Yaya Han, Luna Haruna, DJ HeavyGrinder, Ali Hillis, Kazuhiko Inoue, Matthew Lassiter, Erica Lindbeck, Toshio Maeda, Ian McGinty, Moderately Okay Cosplay, Chie Nakamura, None Like Joshua, Brina Palencia, PixelPantz, Hitoshi Sakimoto, Stephanie Sheh, Keith Silverstein, Michael Sinterniklaas, SkyBlew, Gaku Space, Takaaki Suzuki, TeddyLoid, Kana Ueda, Vedetta Marie, Cristina Vee, and Travis Willingham.
September 20–23, 2018	Renaissance Atlanta Waverly Hotel & Convention Center; Cobb Galleria Centre; Atlanta, Georgia	32,000 (est.)	Dante Basco, Bryson Baugus, Steve Blum, Kira Buckland, Ray Chase, Ben Creighton, Elisa, Andy Field, Scott Frerichs, Kanae Ito, Lauren Landa, Nick Landis, Matthew Lassiter, Brittany Lauda, Ai Maeda, Kyle McCarley, Mary Elizabeth McGlynn, Miyavi, Chris Niosi, None Like Joshua, ROOKiEZ is PUNK'D, Anthony Sardinha, Juliet Simmons, Mike Sinterniklaa, Matilda Smedius, Micah Solusod, John Swasey, TeddyLoid, Vedetta Marie, Lisle Wilkerson, and Apphia Yu (Ayu Sakata).
October 31 - November 3, 2019	Renaissance Atlanta Waverly Hotel & Convention Center; Cobb Galleria Centre; Atlanta, Georgia	35,000 (est.)	Yuu Asakawa, Mashiro Ayano, Scott Gibbs, Tiffany Grant, Caleb Hyles, IA, Samantha Inoue-Harte, Christina Marie Kelly, Subaru Kimura, Matthew Lassiter, E. Jason Liebrecht, LM.C, Mana, Kayli Mills, Myth & Roid, nano, None Like Joshua, Adrian Petriw, TeddyLoid, Elias Toufexis, Vedetta Marie, David Wald, and Lisle Wilkerson.
December 18–20, 2020	Online convention		
October 28–31, 2021	Renaissance Atlanta Waverly Hotel & Convention Center; Cobb Galleria Centre; Atlanta, Georgia	25,000 (est.)	ACME, Dante Basco, Khoi Dao, Chris Guerrero, Kyle Hebert, Caleb Hyles, Faye Mata, Lisa Ortiz, Casey Renee, Alejandro Saab, Derick Snow, Laura Stahl, TeddyLoid, Austin Tindle, Eric Vale, and Cristina Vee.
October 27–30, 2022	Renaissance Atlanta Waverly Hotel & Convention Center; Cobb Galleria Centre; Atlanta, Georgia	32,000 (est.)	Bennett Abara, Asca, Burnout Syndromes, Bill Butts, Roger Clark, Maile Flanagan, Lizzie Freeman, Stephen Fu, Diana Garnet, Caitlin Glass, Chris Hackney, Caleb Hyles, Brianna Knickerbocker, Jackie Lastra, Brittany Lauda, Kyle McCarley, Tony Oliver, Pixy, Matt Shipman, TeddyLoid, Eric Vale, and Brandon Winckler.
October 26–29, 2023	Renaissance Atlanta Waverly Hotel & Convention Center; Cobb Galleria Centre; Atlanta, Georgia	34,000 (est.)	Chika Anzai, Asaka, Katelyn Barr, Poonam Basu, Griffin Burns, Christine Marie Cabanos, D.C. Douglas, FEMM, Cris George, Tiffany Grant, Jarrod Greene, Todd Haberkorn, Erika Harlacher, Jill Harris, Kyle Hebert, Caleb Hyles, Samantha Inoue-Harte, Joel McDonald, Cassandra Lee Morris, Trina Nishimura, Atelier Pierrot, Dallas Reid, Michelle Ruff, James Sie, Stereo Dive Foundation, John Swasey, Veronica Taylor, TeddyLoid, Cristina Vee, and Billy West.
December 12–15, 2024	Georgia World Congress Center, Building C Atlanta, Georgia		Zach Aguilar, Ash Da Hero, Johnny Yong Bosch, Sean Chiplock, Luci Christian, Colleen Clinkenbeard, Creep-P, Jordan Dash Cruz, Kelsey Cruz, Lizzie Freeman, Tiffany Grant, Michael Kovach, Marissa Lenti, David Matranga, Adam McArthur, Ashley Nichols, Alex Organ, Nami Tamaki, Kaiji Tang, Misa Watanabe, and Anne Yatco.
December 18-21, 2025	Georgia World Congress Center, Building C Atlanta, Georgia		A.J. Beckles, James Cheek, Flow, May Hong, Mariya Ise, Brittney Karbowski, Ryan Colt Levy, Emi Lo, Madkid, Kristen McGuire, MindaRyn, Max Mittelman, Reagan Murdock, Anairis Quiñones, Rolling Quartz, Megan Shipman, Derick Snow, Natalie Van Sistine, Howard Wang, and Suzie Yeung.
November 19-22, 2026	Georgia World Congress Center, Building C Atlanta, Georgia		Abigail Blythe, Xanthe Huynh, Anjali Kunapaneni, and Joshua Waters.
