= Yves Rodier =

Canadian cartoonist

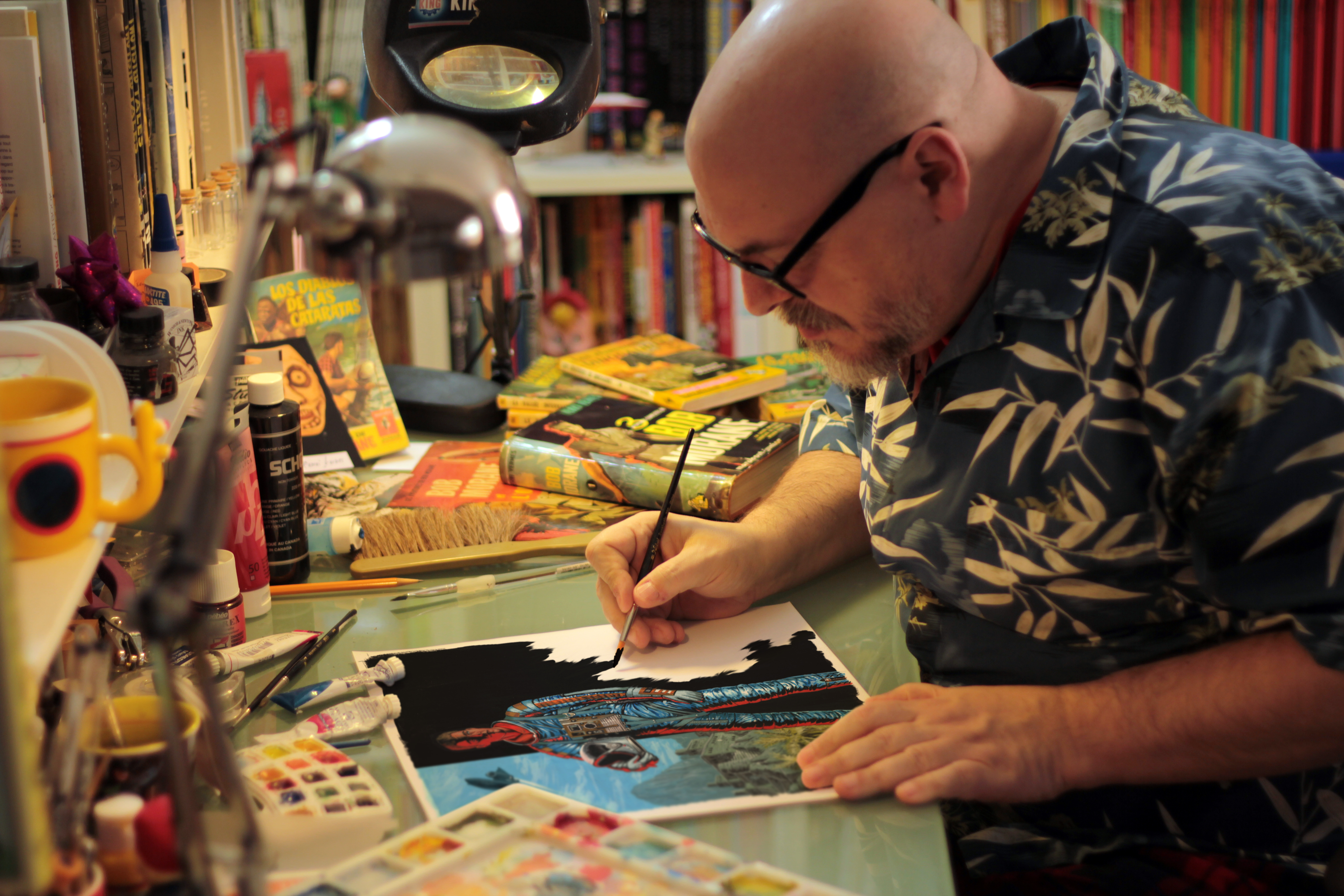
- Rodier at work on a Bob Morane illustration, February 2019
- Born: June 5, 1967 (age 59) Farnham, Quebec
- Area: Cartoonist
- Notable works: Pastiches of The Adventures of Tintin; Pignouf et Hamlet

Yves Rodier (born June 5, 1967) is a Canadian comic strip creator known for his many pastiches of The Adventures of Tintin.

== Biography ==
Rodier always loved comics, but first set out to become a musician or cinematographer. He soon returned to comics. He started out by imitating the work of his favorite author, Hergé, creating pastiches of The Adventures of Tintin. These copies were illegal and did not earn him much money, although they allowed him to meet many other cartoonists, such as Bob de Moor, Jacques Martin and Michel "Greg" Regnier. In 1995, he met Daniel and Richard Houde and in their magazine Pignouf, he started his comic series Pignouf et Hamlet, about a boy and his pig. The magazine only lasted for five issues, though the series continued.

== Work ==
=== The Tintin Pastiches ===
Rodier always had a passion for The Adventures of Tintin by Hergé and so he embarked on writing some Tintin stories of his own. As Tintin pastiches, they imitated the style of Hergé. They are illegal, as they breach the Tintin copyright owned by the Hergé Foundation (Moulinsart), but some have been published, and they are all found circulating on the Internet. Today he is one of the largest (unofficial) Tintin draughtsmen, along with Harry Edwood.

==== Tintin and Alph-Art (1991) ====
The unfinished Tintin book Tintin and Alph-Art was unofficially completed by Rodier in black-and-white. Several groups have coloured it, such as 'Alph-junis', and have translated it into English. It was published in Autumn 1986 and then presented to Moulinsart. Rodier asked that it become an official book but Moulinsart refused. In September 1991, Rodier met Bob de Moor, and together they asked for permission to re-draw the book. Moulinsart still disagreed, and De Moor died in 1992. Rodier later re-drew certain parts of it to make them more akin to the style of Hergé. It was only released on CD-ROM, as opposed to being printed like the other edition.

==== A Day at the Airport (1996) ====
Hergé once suggested that a good idea for his next Tintin story would be to set it in an airport. However, he chose to set it in the art world instead and partially produced Tintin and Alph-art. Rodier started out a new book called A Day at the Airport though it was abandoned, with the first page leaking onto the web. The plot involves a character from the Tintin stories, General Alcazar, being shot, apparently by Dr. Müller, a villain from the Tintin series.

==== Tintin in Tibet page 27b ====
Rodier also did an extra page for Hergé's Tintin in Tibet which Hergé deleted from his comic.

==== Tintin, Freelance reporter for Le Petit Vingtième (1993) ====
The origin of the story lies in a scenario for a drawing contest in the Journal de Spirou number 1027, from December 19, 1957.

Twenty years later, Yves Rodier used the story for another drawing contest, converted it as a Tintin plot and drew 6 half-pages of a story that takes place right before "Tintin and The soviets". Those pages explains how Tintin gets the job as a reporter. For the story Rodier didn't win the contest as he was disqualified for using already existing characters.

==== The Witches Lake (2003) ====
This seven-page story was entirely thought up by Rodier and is sometimes called The Sorcerers Lake. It is about a monster in the local lake and is set before Tintin in Tibet. Rodier drew them (with interruptions) from 1996 to 2003.

==== Tintin et le Thermozéro ====
Rodier's version of Le Thermozéro is an inking from page 4 of sketches made from Hergé.

==== Le Prisonnier du Dragon Rouge ====
Unfinished story intended as a continuation of Tintin au Tibet.

==== Destination Hollywood (2011) ====
For the publication of the Tintin animated film 2011, Rodier and Philippe Antoine drew a two-page short story for the magazine Safair, in which Steven Spielberg, the director of the film himself, has a short appearance.

==== Tintin á Hollywood (2020) ====
In January 2020, it was announced that Rodier was working on a new pastiche with Tintin. The drawings are similar to Hergé's style in "Tintin in America".

==== Le Cargo de la Méduse (2003) ====
In 2003, Rodier drew some drawings for an adventure with the young Capitaine Haddock as the main character. There is now a cover and some designs, including half a page.

=== Pignouf and Hamlet ===
The stories of a boy and his pig. Neither have been translated into English. They were published by David.

- The Wild Band — The first book was published in 2000; its French name is La Bande Sauvage.
- The Claw of the Tiger — The second book was abandoned when Rodier took up his next series. Some of it can be seen on the Internet.

=== Simon Nian ===
This series is published by François Corteggiani.

- Dzizi and the Screw (June 2005)
- The Demons of Petransac (2006)
- The Cursed Exposure (2011)

== Style ==
While in his version of Tintin and Alph-Art some panels were simply copied from Hergé's albums (especially from "Coke en Stock"), Rodier, encouraged by Bob de Moor, tried to make his own drawings. In his series Simon Nian, Rodier uses the style of the illustrator Maurice Tillieux.

== Relationship with Bob de Moor ==
Rodier recounted his first meeting with Bob de Moor in an interview in 2014: "... Bob and me met at the 'Festival BD' in Brossard, near Montréal, in September 1991. We had already corresponded a few times before, regarding my version of "Alph-Art" which I was drawing at the time. More specifically, I had asked him a few technical precisions, the type of pens that he used, etc..." De Moor was enthusiastic about Rodier's drawings (he called Alph-Art "utopian"). Rodier had a good relationship with De Moor, until his death in August 1992.
