= Arryn Zech =

American voice actress

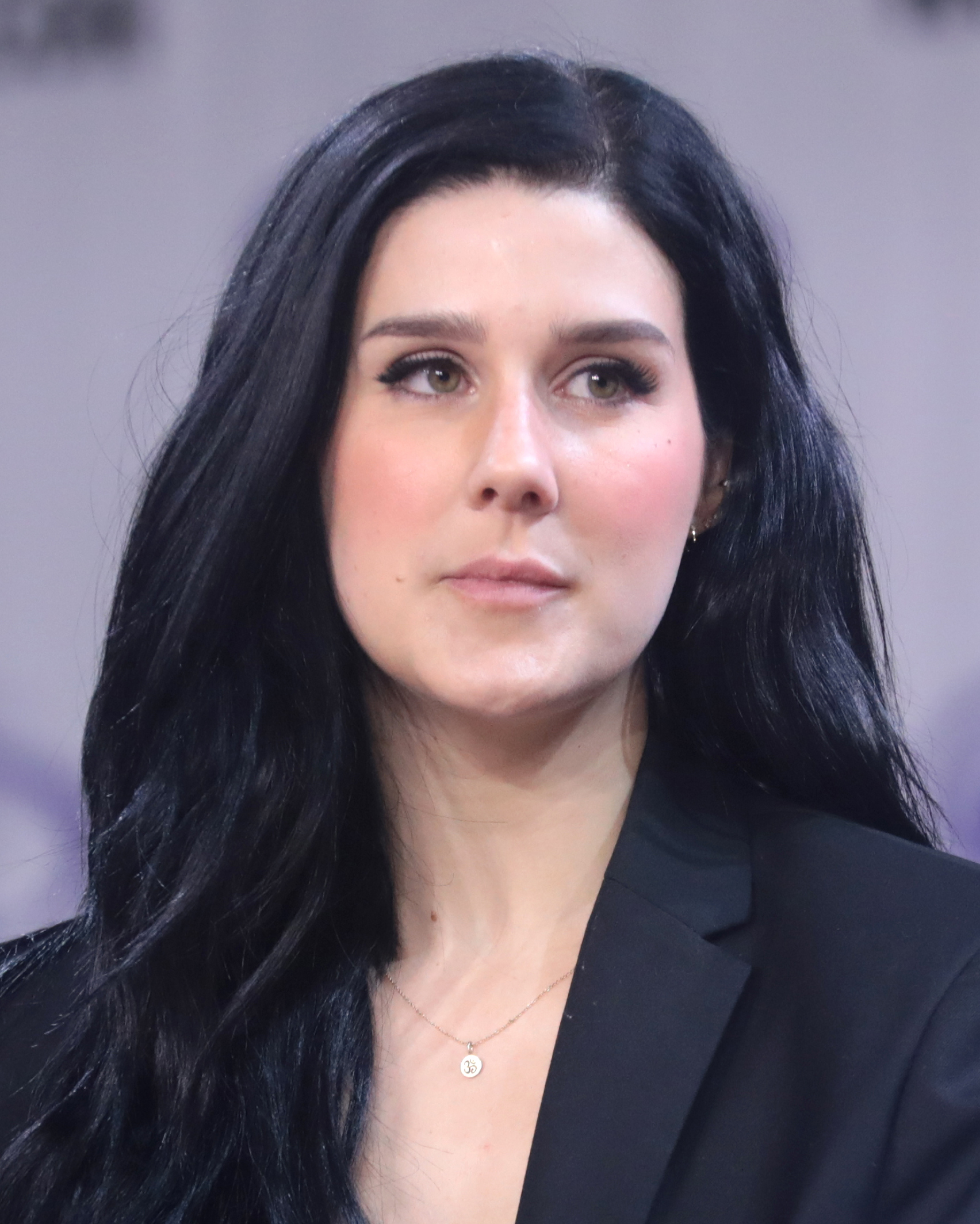
- Zech in 2023
- Born: Rota, Andalusia, Spain
- Education: University of Texas at Austin
- Occupation: Voice actress
- Years active: 2013–present
- Television: RWBY; Red vs. Blue
- Partner: Meghan Camarena

Arryn Zech is an American voice actress. She is best known for voicing Blake Belladonna in the animated web series RWBY, Dr. Emily Grey in the Halo machinina series Red vs. Blue, and Black Swan from Honkai: Star Rail.

== Early life ==
Zech was born in Rota, Andalusia, Spain. She began acting in a New Braunfels theater in A Bug's Life production and working in local theater. She attended North East School of Arts in San Antonio, Texas, a musical theater school. She revealed, in a 2023 interview, that she considered going to law school, but decided to become an actress instead.

She later graduated with a Bachelor's Degree in Journalism from the University of Texas at Austin, concentrating in copy editing and design. While there she worked at the student-run television station, TSTV, as a writer, host, and actress.

== Career ==
=== RWBY ===
In 2013, she began voicing Blake Belladonna in RWBY. In the 2019 companion book to the series, Zech said that she was still in college when she learned of Monty Oum's pitch to voice Blake Belladonna, saying that Oum gave her the role, although "he hadn't fully fleshed out what he wanted from Blake" and told her, "you and Blake will have to figure each other out."

In August 2014, in an interview with Collider, she talked about fan response to the character, what people could expect in season 2, and voiced her support for the ship of Blake and Yang Xiao Long, known as "Bumbleby". She would later, in a companion book to the series, describe Blake as "very secretive and introverted" at first and Blake's "erstwhile suitors," including ex-boyfriend Adam Taurus, Sun Wukong, and Ilia Amitola, add, "personally, I'm hoping for Yang in the future". She would also describe Ilia's love for Blake as "something a lot of gay kids go through, pining after their straight friend" and describe Sun and Blake as "adorable together, with cute chemistry." The ship with Yang would become canon in the show's ninth season, when both characters kissed on screen.

Zech voiced Blake in various video games such as Smite in 2014, Paladins in 2016, BlazBlue: Cross Tag Battle in 2018, Smite: Battleground of the Gods in 2019, and RWBY: Arrowfell in 2022. She would also reprise the voice in RWBY Chibi. The series returned as part of the "Neon Konbini" block in 2021.

In October 2018, in an interview with Supanova Expo, Zech stated that she was proud of the show's cast and character development. She also described how Monty Oum chose her for the role and noted that each of the four main actresses, including her, chose hairstyles, clothing, and design, which were used in the final character designs of the four protagonists.

In March 2022, Zech expressed discomfort with being involved in RWBY: Ice Queendom upon being made aware of the 2015 domestic abuse allegations concerning series writer Tow Ubukata, which prompted Ubukata to tweet in response to Zech. Zech later tweeted to confirm that she would be reprising her voice role of Blake Belladonna in the English dub of Ice Queendom, stating that she had internal discussions with the staff and that she would be donating her payment for her work to an undisclosed charity. Her voice role in the English dubbed version of the series was confirmed by later press releases, and articles, which described the project as an anime based on the original RWBY series.

In October 2022, Zech stated that Rooster Teeth threatened her with recasting Blake if she didn't accept the wage offered to her.

In 2023, she voiced Blake Belladonna in the Justice League x RWBY: Super Heroes and Huntsmen Part One crossover film. The film premiered at WonderCon 2023 on March 25.

=== Other work ===
Zech voice acts as Dr. Emily Grey in Red vs. Blue in 2013. In 2016, she said that when she voices Dr. Grey, she has "bubbly hands, almost Disney Princess hands".

Zech portrayed a character in an episode of the Lethal Weapon TV series in 2017.

She voiced characters in English dubs of various anime in the 2020s. This included "The Ripper" in the Wandering Witch: The Journey of Elaina episode "The Ripper", Ayana Taketatsu in The Detective Is Already Dead, and Gentiane in the anime Girls' Frontline.

In February 2023, she noted that she had begun writing her first EP, and described it as "incredibly fun". In a March 2023, she stated that she was getting a songwriter certification with online classes and was "pretty excited" about her EP. Her official website also stated that in fall 2023, she would be attending the Berklee School of Music to further her study of music and assist with producing her EP "in the near future." The EP was released in October 4, 2025, her birthday, on various music platforms.

In 2024, GameSpot noted that she was the English dubbed voice of Black Swan in the video game Honkai: Star Rail.

=== Convention appearances ===
In June 2022, Zech told LGBT magazine Diva that RWBY had "changed her life" and said that going to its conventions have allowed her to "come out of her shell" and be honest about her experiences with abusive relationships, mental health, and eating disorders.

In 2016, she appeared at Montreal Comiccon and MCM London Comic Con. In 2017, she made appearances at Fan Expo Canada, Fan Expo Boston, and Ottawa Comiccon. The next year, she appeared at Armageddon Expo in Auckland, New Zealand. In 2019, she appeared at MCM London Comic Con, and Phoenix Fan Fusion

In May 2018, she and Lindsay Jones cancelled their appearances at FanX Salt Lake Comic Convention after criticism of the convention for its "insensitive response" to accusations of sexual harassment.

In May 2020, Zech appeared at the Anime Frontier convention, which was sponsored by Crunchyroll, at the Fort Worth Convention Center. She also appeared at the conference in later years. Zech previously appeared at Wizard World Virtual Experience with RWBY cast members in April 2020, and in the same convention in 2018. Zech is scheduled to appear at Big Lick Comic Con, in Northern Virginia, in late May 2026, along with Jones, Barbara Dunkelman and Kara Eberle, other members of the RWBY voice cast. Previously, she was on "The World of Remnant" panel with Jones, Eberle, and Michael Jones at Anime Corpus Christi.

Zech also made appearances at Comic Con Scotland and Anime North in 2022.

== Personal life ==
Zech is bisexual. In a February 2023 interview with Naluda Magazine, Zech said that she loves playing video games, gardening, and supporting civil rights and animal rights, Black Lives Matter, LGBTQ issues, and women's rights. She also described leaving Twitter as a "game changer" for her mental health. In another interview, in March 2023, by her friend Barbara Dunkelman on the "Always Open" YouTube series, Zech said that physical touch, quality time, and words of affirmation would be important in any romantic relationship. In the same interview, she also said she would "never go back" to Twitter because it is harder for people to "access her" in a "negative way", and told Dunkleman that issues with dating as a bisexual woman is a "universal bisexual problem".

In March 2026, Zech posted on social media that she was dating Meghan Camarena, a pansexual YouTube personality, television host, actress, and comic book writer, with both beginning a relationship after messaging each other online. Caramena later shared that she and Zech were living together. In other social media posts, Zech called Camarena a person who makes her "feel safe and loved" and "pretty girl". Carmena called Zech a "sounding board, a safe space, an incredible teammate...easily the hottest roommate to ever exist" and a "special" person.

== Filmography ==
=== Film ===
Year	Title	Role	Notes	Ref
2015	Lazer Team	Cheerleader	Cameo	
2023	Justice League x RWBY: Super Heroes & Huntsmen	Blake Belladonna (voice)	Direct-to-video	
2024	Red vs. Blue: Restoration	Dr. Emily Grey (voice)	Direct-to-video	

=== Anime ===
List of voice performances in anime
Year	Title	Role	Notes	Ref
2020	Kaguya-sama: Love Is War	Guest voice	English dub (Note: Episode: "Yu Ishigami Closes His Eyes, Part 3/Miyuki Shirogane and Yu Ishigami/Kyoko Otomo Doesn't Realize")	
2020	Wandering Witch: The Journey of Elaina	The Ripper	English dub (Note: Episode: "The Ripper")	
2021	The Detective Is Already Dead	Nagisa Natsunagi	English dub	
2022	RWBY: Ice Queendom	Blake Belladonna	English dub	

=== Web series ===
Year	Title	Role	Notes	Ref
2013–present	RWBY	Blake Belladonna (voice)	Also motion capture	
2013–2019	Red vs. Blue	Dr. Emily Grey (voce)		
2016–2018; 2021	RWBY Chibi	Blake Belladonna (voice)		
2020	Vote for Love	Zoey (voice)	(Note: Episode: "Rising Oceans, Rising Voices")	
2021	Death Battle	Blake Belladonna (voice)	Episode: "Blake vs Mikasa"	
2025	Tales of the Stinky Dragon	Fizzmum (voice)	Episode: "C03 - Ep. 15 - Brig of Endridge Bay - Old Faces, New Faces, Dead Faces"	

=== Television ===
Year	Title	Role	Notes	Ref
2017	Lethal Weapon	Waitress	Episode: "The Murtaugh File"	

=== Video games ===
Year	Title	Role	Notes	Ref
2014	Smite	Blake Belladonna	Voice only	
2016	RWBY: Grimm Eclipse	Blake Belladonna	Voice only	
2018	BlazBlue: Cross Tag Battle	Blake Belladonna	Voice only	
2018	Paladins	Blake Belladonna	Voice only	
2022	RWBY: Arrowfell	Blake Belladonna	Voice only	
2022	Girls' Frontline	Gentiane	English dub; Voice only	
2024	Honkai: Star Rail	Black Swan	Voice only, English dub	

== Discography ==
=== Extended plays ===
List of extended plays, showing selected details
Title	Details
Catharsis	Released: October 4, 2025; Label: Nouveau Noir; Formats: Digital download, streaming; Track listing: 1. "Help Yourseslf"; 2. "What Are The Odds"; 3. "Jorogumo"; 4. "The Worst Thing To Happen At The Sunset Tower"
