= The Knights of Emerald =

Heroic fantasy book series by Anne Robillard

The Knights of Emerald is a series of heroic fantasy novels which made the fame of its author, Canadian novelist Anne Robillard. The series was first written in French and published by Éditions de Mortagne in Québec, and was later sold in France by Michel Lafon and France Loisirs. Since their release, the books have become immensely popular in Quebec, selling millions of copies. The series was later translated to English by its author and distributed digitally. The story continues with Les Héritiers d'Enkidiev and Les Chevaliers d'Antarès, two more series of twelve tomes each, although these do not appear to have been translated to English.

== Plot ==
Five hundred years ago, Enkidiev, a continent populated by humans, elves, and fairies, is being attacked by Amecareth, emperor of Irianeth and the insect empire. The threat of a new invasion looms over Enkidiev. The only hope for them to survive is to recreate the order of the Knights of Emerald by the King Emerald 1st. These magic warriors are to protect the continent until the prophesied Light holder can destroy the threat. It starts off with the land of Enkidiev, where multiple Kingdoms are situated. The Kingdom that is focused most upon is the Emerald Kingdom, seeing as the Emerald Knights are trained and will live there for the majority of their lives.

== The Emerald Knights ==
The Emerald Knights are an elite group of warriors and magicians that are trained in the Emerald Kingdom. Children who show off magical capabilities are brought to the castle to be evaluated by a magician, and then deemed either capable or incapable of becoming a knight. From infancy to their teens, children will study under the magician and previous knights as well as warriors. They then will be employed as Squires to the Emerald Knights, helping them and providing for them on their adventures as well as gaining some practical knowledge. After spending a few years as a Squire, they will then be able to gain the title of "Emerald Knight". The last book is to be released in September. Here is a list of the books:

- Fire in the Sky
- Dragons of the Dark Emperor
- Kingdom of Shadows
- A Rebellious Princess
- Reptile Island
- The Chronicles of Onyx
- The Abduction
- Fallengods
- Danalieth's Legacy
- Retaliation
- Celestial Justice
- Irianeth
