= Shawn Baichoo =

Canadian voice actor

- Born: December 4, 1979 (age 46); Montreal, Quebec, Canada
- Occupations: Voice actor and motion capture artist
- Years active: 1998–present
- Spouse: Vikki Walker (m. 2005)

Shawn Baichoo (born 4 December 1979) is a Canadian voice actor and motion capture artist who has been acting since 1998.

== Career ==
He started theatre studies in Montreal and has worked in television, film, theatre, fight choreography, stunts, animation, until he specialized on dubbing video games.

He has been involved in Ubisoft projects and he played Miles Upshur in Outlast(2013) and Blake Langermann in Outlast II (2017), Lion in Rainbow Six: Siege (2015), Niccolò Machiavelli in Assassin's Creed II (2009) and Assassin's Creed: Brotherhood (2010), Unferth in Beowulf (2007), and Wrench in Watch Dogs 2, and the Bloodline expansion pack of Watch Dogs Legion, among others.

He starred Father Antonio Maffei in Assassin's Creed: Lineage (2009), and he also produced, co-wrote and starred in The Punisher: No Mercy alongside Jason Ambrus and Amber Goldfarb.

== Personal life ==
Baichoo married his wife Vikki Walker on September 17, 2005.
