= Anne Robillard =

Canadian novelist (born 1955)

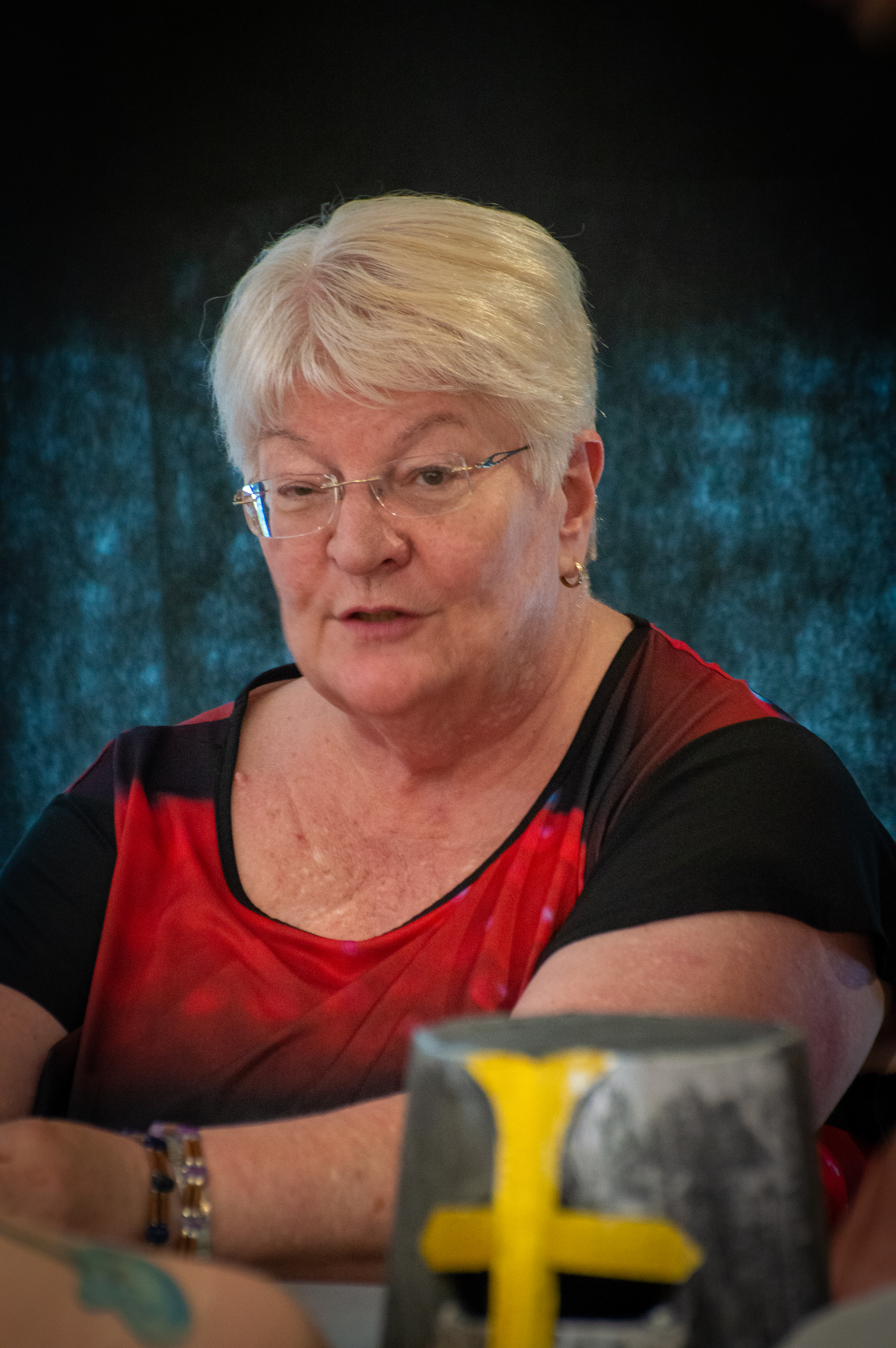
- Robillard at the Japan Addict cosplay festival in Strasbourg, France (2023)
- Born: Anne Robillard; 9 February 1955 (age 71); Montreal, Quebec, Canada
- Education: Bachelor of Translation and Arts
- Alma mater: University of Montreal
- Occupation: Novelist
- Writing career
- Period: 2002–present
- Genre: Fantasy
- Notable work: Knights of Emerald series
- Website: www.anne-robillard.com

Anne Robilard (born 9 February 1955) is a Canadian novelist, best known as the author of the Knights of Emerald heroic fantasy series. The Knights of Emerald books have known an enormous attention in French-speaking countries, such as France, and especially Canada, more than a million copies having been sold, only in Quebec. They are being translated into English, and the few ones now available in that language have already known success. The series counts 12 books, and is followed by another series, called the "Enkidiev Inheritors", which has also become very famous in a short period of time.

== Biography ==
Born from a ballet professor (Pierette Gagné), and an actor famous for being in "Passe-Partout", a Quebec television program from 1977 (Jean-Claude Robillard), Anne Robillard was, as could be imagined, as much raised in an imaginary world of dance, as in the financial insecurity of the artistic world. As such, she opted for a more financially stable option, working as a judicial secretary, allowing her to continue her studies in Literature and Foreign Languages Translation, at the Montreal University.

In 2003, she finally chose to quit her job, and start to work at home, as a freelance journalist, and in 2005, to embrace her dream of writing books.

As a child, she already read fantasy books from authors such as Tolkien (The Hobbit, The Lord of The Rings), even wrote some, and as such, starting her novelist career, she first wrote heroic fantasy books. The "Knights of Emerald" series, of which the first book was originally written in 2002, and counts 12 books. Robillard having finished this series in 2008, it was asked by her fans that she start a new series which would follow the "Knights of Emerald" series. In 2011, she fulfilled her fans demand, by creating a new series called "Enkidiev's Legacy", which did continue the last series, but started 15 years later. Apart from her main series, she also wrote other books, like "Who is Terra Wilder?", in 2006, followed by "Captain Wilder" in 2010, as well as "A.N.G.E.L." about the end of the world. She also wrote the esoteric series "Alexanne's Wings" and "Wisdom of the Thunderbird" and a rock'n roll series "Crystal Chords". Thanks to the help of an illustrator, Tiburce Oger, she managed to create a comic book version of "Knights of Emerald". This "reboot" is actually made of 4 books, five in the fall of 2015.

She also managed to earn quite a few rewards for her books, such as the "Archambault Grand Prix" for the fifth installment of the Knights of Emerald, and the Readers Contest Reader's award in France, in 2007.

== Selected works ==
In all, she wrote 60 novels, six comic books and three companion books in French. All are being translated at this time, soon to be offered in English.

- Knights of Emerald (Les Chevaliers d'Émeraude) : 12 books
- A.N.G.E.L. (A.N.G.E.) : 10 books
- Alexanne's Wings (Les Ailes d'Alexanne) : 9 books
- Enkidiev's Legacy (Les Héritiers d'Enkidiev) : 12 books
- Wisdom of the Thunderbird (Le Retour de l'oiseau-tonnerre): 3 books
- Crystal Chords (Les Cordes de cristal) : 12 books
- Knights of Emerald (comic book, Les Chevaliers d'Émeraude) : 11 books
- A.N.G.E.L. (comic book, A.N.G.E.) : 1 book
- Enkidiev yours to discover (Enkidiev, un monde à découvrir, companion book)
- A.N.G.E.L. authorized personnel only (A.N.G.E. personnel autorisé seulement, companion book)
- Enlilkisar the new world (Enlilkisar, le nouveau monde, companion book)
- Terra Wilder : 2 books
- Knights of Antarès (Les Chevaliers d'Antarès) : 12 books
- The Curse of the Dragensblöt (La malédiction des Dragensblöt): 7 books
- Legends of Ashur- Sîn: 6 books
