= FilKONtario =

Filk Convention

- Status: Active
- Genre: Filk music
- Location: Ontario
- Country: Canada
- Inaugurated: 1991
- Website: https://www.filkontario.ca

FilKONtario is a fan-run convention in the Greater Toronto Area, Ontario area dedicated to filk, the music of science fiction and fantasy fandom. Established in 1991, it is the only filk convention in Canada. In its fifth year (1995), the convention initiated the Filk Hall of Fame, which continues to recognize those who have made significant contributions to filk music and the filk community, worldwide. This international awards program is administered through FilKONtario, with an international jury.

== History ==
At the time FilKONtario was founded, there were only five filk conventions worldwide: Consonance (San Francisco area), ConChord (Los Angeles area, started 1983), the Northeast Filk Con, and Ohio Valley Filk Fest (Columbus area, started in 1984), and the British Filk Con (started in 1989). Heather Borean, the first conchair, wanted something a little closer to home and proposed the idea of founding a new con. The name is a concatenation of "Filk", "KON" (for "convention") and "Ontario." The early days of FilKONtario were a bit challenging. Attendance was low the first few years, but a feeling of relaxed inclusiveness, following the lead of the con's first year guests, Bill and Brenda Sutton, became the norm. In 1994, the convention drew a large crowd, with guest Kathy Mar, and has been quietly growing since that time.

In the first year the convention mascot was established, which is a penguin with a guitar.

Like most filk conventions, other than the Ohio Valley Filk Fest, FilKONtario is a small event, usually with about 130-150 attendees. Gradually the convention has grown from modest beginnings to offer programming Friday evening through Sunday afternoon, with requisite filk circles until the early morning, workshops in the mornings and a "Dead Penguin" (a play on "dead dog") sing Sunday evening. In addition, the guest roster has grown from a single guest of honour, to having a GoH, a Filk Waif, an Interfilk Guest and an occasional Special Guest, an author or artist from Southern Ontario. "Filk Waif" is an idiosyncratic term honoring the first waif, Mary Ellen Wessels, whom two of the concom members brought to the con at their expense because she couldn't afford it. (Hence, "waif".) The role is identical to Toastmaster.

In 2007, in cooperation with Interfilk and after two years of fundraising, FilKONtario's only guest was the n'Early Music Consort, a choir of sixteen performers from England. This is thought to be one of the largest guest slates offered at a small convention.

FilKONtario has been the honoured recipient of guests funded by Interfilk since 1994. Interfilk is an international arts charity registered as a 501(c)(3) in California. FilKONtario is one of the recognized cons on that charity site.

== Typical convention activities ==
Programming typically includes: Concerts, song-writing contests, workshops on guitar, voice, performance, etc., one-shots, dealers' room, a fund-raising auction for Interfilk, theme circles, and, especially, open song circles where everyone who chooses can sing and play, and listeners are especially welcome. The circles start in the late evening and go into the early hours of the morning, or later. There is an opening reception, and sometimes a CD release. Some children's programming is usually available.

Recording of the concerts and filks has been done since the first year of FilKONtario, resulting in the following releases, the first two on tape, the remainder on CD:

- Make Believe (FilKONtario 1), Wail Songs
- Let's Have a Filksing (FilKONtario 2), Wail Songs
- Songs From FilKONtario 7: Why Can't Penguins Filk?, Love Song Productions, A Dozen Cats Studios (Savedsounds and USB Studios)
- Where the Magic is Real (FilKONtario 8), a joint production of FilKONtario and USB Studios
- Filk Dreams — music from FilKONtario 9, USB Studios
- Filk Memories — music from FilKONtario 10, USB Studios
- FilkNotes — the music from FilKONtario 11, USB Studios
- Filk Together — music from FilKONtario 12, USB Studios
- Triskaidekafilkia — music from FilKONtario 13, USB Studios

== Filk Hall of Fame ==
Inductions into the Filk Hall of Fame take place at the Saturday evening banquet. The Hall was created to honour "contributions to filk music and the filk community". Each year a jury reviews the nominations and votes anonymously for their selections. Once the votes are tallied, the Administrator contacts the inductees for the current year. The citations noting the inductees' contributions are read at the banquet, and those inductees present are given a copy of the citation and a plaque. These items are mailed to those not present.

The next day there is a concert in honour of the new Hall of Fame inductees. Each new inductee selects five pieces of music significant to him, her or them. These are performed at the concert.

There is additional extensive material about how to nominate and what constitutes contributions to the filk community on the Filk Hall of Fame web site. In addition there is a complete list of inductees and their citations.

Citation: Songs noted in citations for inductees to the Filk Hall of Fame were used as part of the empirical database for this academic article

== Outreach ==
The FilKONtario Concom (convention organizing committee) has twice produced the filk track at a Worldcon: At Torcon 3, 2003, Toronto, ON and at Anticipation, 2009, Montreal PQ.

In preparation for Anticipation, two of the concom developed a multi-media presentation called "From the Earth to the Moon: a celebration of manned space flight". This presentation included PowerPoint, live narration and live music, with many members of the concom and filkers who were present at the con. It was the keynote filk track item for Anticipation.

Since then the concom has staged "From the Earth to the Moon", four more times: FilKONtario 2010, a meeting of the USS Hudson Bay (a local science fiction fan club) June, 2010; SFContario, November, 2010; and ConFusion, January, 2011. The latter three were by specific invitation of the organizing group.

In addition a similar performance focusing on both manned and unmanned space exploration was performed at the invitation of the University of Toronto's Astronomy and Space Exploration Society presentation on 26 September 2009 as an opening act for keynote speaker Dr. David Charbonneau.

== Upcoming convention ==
The next FilkONtario convention will take place at Monte Carlo Inn & Suites Downtown Markham, Ontario April 17-19, 2026.

== Previous conventions ==
#	Dates	Location	Guest of Honour	Official Filk Waif	Interfilk Guest	Special Guest	Songwriting Contest	Hall of Fame	Committee
1	Apr 12–14, 1991	Holiday Inn; Mississauga	Bill and Brenda Sutton	--	--	--	A theme song for FilKONtario	--	Heather Borean (chair), Howard Scrimgeour, Wayne Borean, Joan MacDougall, Terri Neal, Lidia Tremblay
2	Apr 10–12, 1992	Holiday Inn; Mississauga	Tom Smith	--	--	--	Buttons and T-shirts	--	Heather Borean (chair), Howard Scrimgeour, Lidia Tremblay, Wayne Borean, Lloyd Penney, Yvonne Penney
3	May 7–9, 1993	Holiday Inn; Mississauga	Michael Longcor	Mary Ellen Wessels (unofficial)	--	--	Aliens	--	Heather Borean (chair), Howard Scrimgeour, Judith Hayman, Dave Hayman, Wayne Borean, Lloyd Penney, Yvonne Penney
4	Apr 15–17, 1994	Regal Constellation; Etobicoke	Kathy Mar	Mary Ellen Wessels	Heather Rose Jones	--	Technology	--	Heather Borean, Wayne Borean, Dave Hayman, Judith Hayman (chair), Howard Scrimgeour, Lynda Hurdis, Linda Baker
5	Mar 31-Apr 2, 1995	Holiday Inn Yorkdale; Toronto	Decadent Dave Clement	Steve Macdonald	--	--	To the Stars and Fools that Go Filk in the Night	Bob Asprin; Leslie Fish; Off Centaur Publications	Heather Borean, Wayne Borean, Dave Hayman, Judith Hayman (chair), Howard Scrimgeour, Rob Sutherland, Lloyd Penney, Yvonne Penney
6	Apr 19–21, 1996	Venture Inn Airport; Etobicoke	Mary Ellen Wessels	Barry and Sally Childs-Helton	Steve Dixon	--	Magic and Magicians	Juanita Coulson; Julia Ecklar; Bob Laurent; Kathy Mar; Bill Maraschiello	Heather Borean, Carolyn Brown, Dave Hayman, Judith Hayman (chair), Howard Scrimgeour, Peggi Warner-Lalonde, Lloyd Penney, Yvonne Penney
7	Apr 11–13, 1997	Venture Inn Airport; Etobicoke	Talis Kimberley	Clif and Carol Flynt	Doug Wu	--	Songs based on written SF or Fantasy	Lee and Barry Gold; J. Spencer Love; Margaret Middleton	Heather Borean (co-chair), Carolyn Brown, Dave Hayman, Judith Hayman (co-chair), Ken Lalonde, Howard Scrimgeour, Peggi Warner-Lalonde, Lloyd Penney, Yvonne Penney
8	Apr 17-19 1998	Travelodge Hotel; Toronto East	Heather Alexander	John Hall	Juliane Honisch and Katy Dröge	--	A place you'd like to go to	Rafe Culpin; Cynthia McQuillin; Erwin "Filthy Pierre" Strauss	Carolyn Brown (co-chair), Dave Hayman, Judith Hayman, Sally Headford, Ken Lalonde, Howard Scrimgeour, Glenn Simser, Peggi Warner-Lalonde (co-chair), Lloyd Penney, Yvonne Penney
9	Mar 26–28, 1999	Quality Hotel; Toronto Airport, Mississauga	Urban Tapestry	Don Neill	Harold Groot	--	To Space	Gary Anderson "Decadent" Dave Clement; Mary Ellen Wessels	Heather Borean, Carolyn Brown, Dave Hayman, Judith Hayman (chair), Sally Headford, Ken Lalonde, Howard Scrimgeour, Glenn Simser, Peggi Warner-Lalonde (co-chair)
10	Mar 31- Apr 2, 2000	Quality Hotel; Toronto Airport, Mississauga	Larry Warner	Diana Huey	Scott Snyder	--	Tricksters	Zander Nyrond; Dr. Jane Robinson; Bill Roper	Heather Borean (co-chair), Dave Hayman, Judith Hayman (co-chair), Sally Headford, Ken Lalonde, Howard Scrimgeour, Peggi Warner-Lalonde
11	Mar 30-Apr 1, 2001	Quality Hotel; Toronto Airport, Mississauga	Bill and Brenda Sutton	Steve Simmons	Erica Neely	--	Mars and Beyond	Gordon R. Dickson; Gytha North; Bill and Brenda Sutton	Heather Borean, Dave Hayman, Judith Hayman (chair), Sally Headford, Ken Lalonde, Howard Scrimgeour, Peggi Warner-Lalonde, Lloyd Penney, Yvonne Penney
12	Apr 5–7, 2002	Four Points Toronto Airport (Delta Toronto Airport West); Mississauga	Joey Shoji	Dave Weingart	Anke Teschke	Tanya Huff	1. A song based on Tanya's writing; 2. Technology Past and Future	Lissa Allcock; Kirstin Tanger; Alan Thiesen	Heather Borean, Dave Hayman, Judith Hayman, Sally Headford (chair), Ken Lalonde, Howard Scrimgeour, Peggi Warner-Lalonde, Lloyd Penney, Yvonne Penney
13	Mar 28–30, 2003	Delta Toronto; Airport West, Mississauga	Dr. Jane Robinson and Cynthia McQuillin	Mark Bernstein	Robert Cooke	--	Travellers of the Deep	Karen and Poul Anderson; Barry and Sally Childs-Helton; Bob Kanefsky; Chris Malme	Heather Borean, Wayne Borean, Ingrid de Buda, Dave Hayman, Judith Hayman, Sally Headford (chair), Lynda Hurdis, Ken Lalonde, Howard Scrimgeour, Peggi Warner-Lalonde, Lloyd Penney, Yvonne Penney
14	Mar 26–28, 2004	Delta Toronto Airport West	Michael Longcor	Kathleen Sloan	Blind Lemming Chiffon	--	Based on written military SF	Katy Droege and Juliana Honisch; Valerie Housden; Gary McGath	Heather Borean, Wayne Borean, Ingrid de Buda, Dave Hayman, Judith Hayman, Sally Headford, Ken Lalonde, Howard Scrimgeour (chair), Peggi Warner-Lalonde, Lloyd Penney, Yvonne Penney
15	Apr 1–3, 2005	Delta Toronto; Airport West, Mississauga	Steve Macdonald	Judith Hayman	Carla Ulbrich	Michelle Sagara	Recycling in the Future	Clif Flynt; Judith and Dave Hayman; Tom Smith	Heather Borean, Wayne Borean, Dave Hayman, Judith Hayman, Sally Headford (chair), Lynda Hurdis, Ken Lalonde, Sue Posteraro, Howard Scrimgeour, Peggi Warner-Lalonde
16	Mar 31- Apr 2, 2006	Delta Toronto; Airport West, Mississauga	Chris Conway	Tanya Huff	Judi Miller	--	Tolkien's World	Franklin Gunkelman; Steve Macdonald; Lois Mangan; Gretchen Roper	Heather Borean, Wayne Borean, Dave Hayman (chair), Judith Hayman, Sally Headford, Ken Lalonde, Sue Posteraro, Howard Scrimgeour, Peggi Warner-Lalonde
17	Mar 23–25, 2007	Delta Toronto; Airport West, Mississauga	n'Early Music Consort (a sixteen-person filk choir from England)				Harmony	Chris (Keris) Croughton; Bruce Pelz; Kathleen Sloan	Heather Borean, Dave Hayman, Judith Hayman (co-chair), Sally Headford, Ken Lalonde, Sue Posteraro, Howard Scrimgeour, Peggi Warner-Lalonde (co-chair)
18	Apr 4–6, 2008	Delta Toronto; Airport West, Mississauga	Vixy and Tony (Michelle Dockery and Tony Fabris)	Bill Roper	Marilyn Miller	Heather Bruton	Nightmares in the Dark	Bob (Doc) and Anne Passovoy; Steve and Colleen Savitsky	Heather Borean, Jane Garthson, Dave Hayman, Judith Hayman (co-chair), Sally Headford, Lynda Hurdis, Ken Lalonde, Sue Posteraro, Howard Scrimgeour, Peggi Warner-Lalonde (co-chair)
19	Apr 3–5, 2009	Delta Toronto; Airport West, Mississauga	Heather Dale	Urban Tapestry	Gerry and Sandy Tyra	Robert J. Sawyer	Space Games	Erica Neely; Frank Hayes	Heather Borean, Jane Garthson, Dave Hayman, Judith Hayman, Sally Headford (chair), Sue Jeffers, Ken Lalonde, Howard Scrimgeour, Peggi Warner-Lalonde,
20	Apr 9–11, 2010	Delta Toronto; Airport West, Mississauga	Jeff and Maya Bohnhoff	Erica Neely	William Mark Simmons	--	Time Travel	Jan Dimasi; Kristoph Klover; Mike Whitaker	Heather Borean, Jane Garthson, Dave Hayman, Judith Hayman, Sally Headford, Sue Jeffers, Ken Lalonde, Howard Scrimgeour (chair), Peggi Warner-Lalonde
21	Apr 1–3, 2011	Delta Toronto; Airport West, Mississauga	Wild Mercy	Karen Linsley	Ghost of a Rose	--	Coming of Age	Ellen Kranzer; Howard Scrimgeour; Urban Tapestry	Jane Garthson, Dave Hayman, Judith Hayman, Sally Headford, Sue Jeffers (chair), Tom Jeffers, Ken Lalonde, Howard Scrimgeour, Peggi Warner-Lalonde
22	Apr 20–22, 2012	Delta Toronto; Airport West, Mississauga	Kathy Mar	Paul Estin	Steve and Dorotha Biernesser	--	The End of Time	Tom Jeffers; Gary Ehrlich; Persis Thorndike	Jane Garthson, Dave Hayman, Judith Hayman (co-chair), Sally Headford, Sue Jeffers, Tom Jeffers, Ken Lalonde, Howard Scrimgeour, Peggi Warner-Lalonde (co-chair)
23	Apr 19–21, 2013	Delta Toronto; Airport West, Mississauga	Tim & Annie Walker	Rand & Erin Bellavia	Katt McConnell	--	FANtastic Canada	Cecilia Eng; Roberta Rogow; Volker Tanger	Jane Garthson (co-chair), Dave Hayman, Judith Hayman (co-chair), Sally Headford, Sue Jeffers, Tom Jeffers, Ken Lalonde, Howard Scrimgeour, Peggi Warner-Lalonde
24	Apr 25–27, 2014	Delta Toronto; Airport West, Mississauga	S.J. Tucker	Gary Ehrlich	Piers Cawley	Lorna Toolis	Music in Space	Michael Longcor; Talis Kimberley; Kathy Hamilton	Jane Garthson, Dave Hayman, Judith Hayman (co-chair), Ken Lalonde, Howard Scrimgeour, Peggi Warner-Lalonde (co-chair)
25	Apr 16–19, 2015	Delta Toronto; Airport West, Mississauga	Bill & Brenda Sutton; Talis Kimberley	Kari Maaren	Nicole Dieker (Hello, the Future!)	Heather Borean	Silver	Kay Shapero; Nick Smith; Steven Joel Zeve	Dave Hayman, Judith Hayman, Ken Lalonde (chair), Peggi Warner-Lalonde
26	Apr 9–10, 2016	Toronto; Airport West, Mississauga	Cecilia Eng	Peggi Warner-Lalonde	Batya Wittenburg		Animals in Space	Mark Bernstein; Eli Goldberg	Dave Hayman, Judith Hayman, Ken Lalonde, Peggi Warner-Lalonde, Morva Bowman, Alan Pollard
27	Apr 21–23, 2017	Toronto; Airport West Hotel, Mississauga	Mike Whitaker	Cat Faber	Shawna Jacques		Wandering the Digital Highway	Gary Hanak; Judi Miller; Maya and Jeff Bohnhoff	Dave Hayman, Judith Hayman, Ken Lalonde, Peggi Warner-Lalonde, Morva Bowman, Alan Pollard, Sally Headford
28	Apr 20–22, 2018	Monte Carlo; Inn Brampton Suites, Brampton	Leslie Hudson	Tim Griffin	Sabine and Michael Kinder		First Contact	Sibylle Machat; Paul Willett	Dave Hayman, Judith Hayman, Ken Lalonde, Peggi Warner-Lalonde, Morva Bowman, Alan Pollard, Sally Headford
29	Apr 12–14, 2019	Monte Carlo; Inn & Suites; Downtown Markham	Juanita Coulson	Margaret Davis & Kristoph Klover	Summer Loraine Russell		Cosmic Hotels	W. Randy Hoffman; Harold Stein	Dave Hayman, Judith Hayman, Ken Lalonde, Peggi Warner-Lalonde, Morva Bowman, Alan Pollard, Sally Headford
30	Apr 24–26, 2020 (Postponed)	Monte Carlo; Inn & Suites; Downtown Markham	Stone Dragons	The Blibbering Humdingers	PDX Broadsides		Back to the Moon	Juliana McCorison; Rob Wynne; Blind Lemming Chiffon	Dave Hayman, Judith Hayman, Ken Lalonde, Peggi Warner-Lalonde, Morva Bowman, Alan Pollard, Sally Headford

From the FilKONtario program book archive.

=== The Covid years and beyond ===
Covid caused the convention to go online. However, one year there was both an online and in-person convention, although the in-person one occurred much later in the year than normal. In 2024 a new committee took over organizing the convention.

#	Dates	Location	Guest of Honour	Official Filk Waif	Interfilk Guest	Special Guest	Songwriting Contest	Hall of Fame	Committee
	Apr 19-21 2024	Monte Carlo Inn Downtown Markham, Onatrio	The Blibbering Humdingers	-Phil Mills, Jane Garthson	-Eli Bar-Yahalom	--		--	Co-chairs: Erin Belavia, Chris Clarke
	2025	Monte Carlo Inn Downtown Markham, Onatrio							Co-chairs: Erin Belavia, Chris Clarke

== Sources ==
- Access to the print archives of FilKONtario—program books, progress reports, etc. 1991 to 2011.
- Tatum, Identity and Authenticity in the Filk Community, 3 Journal of Transformative Works and Cultures (2009). This article discusses what filk is, references the Filk Hall of Fame administered by FilKONtario, and contains excerpts from Sally Childs-Helton's speech at FilKONtario in 2003.
- Solomon H. Davidoff, "Filk:" A Study of Shared Musical Traditions and Related Phenomena among Fan Groups (M.A. thesis, Bowling Green State University, 1996). Bowling Green State University Thesis 6673. (At BGSU, call no. LD 4191 O6 No 6673.)
