= Bill Roper =

Bill Roper may refer to:

- Bill Roper (American football) (1880–1933), American football player and coach
- Bill Roper (filker) (born 1956), science fiction fan/filker
- Bill Roper (video game producer) (born 1965), computer game producer

== See also ==
- Will Roper, American physicist and Air Force official
- William Roper, biographer
- Willy Roper
