= Cynthia McQuillin =

American singer-songwriter (1953–2006)

Cynthia McQuillin (July 25, 1953 – January 14, 2006) was a filk singer and writer as well as an author and artist. She lived in the San Francisco Bay area. Her songs touched the usual filk topics of science fiction, fantasy, and cats, but also feminism, love, Paganism, and Sizeism.

Her life partner and frequent musical collaborator was the filk singer James Robinson, who was then known as Dr. Jane Robinson. McQuillin reportedly said, upon meeting James for the first time, "At last I get to meet the man I fell in love with!"

Cynthia was inducted to the Filk Hall of Fame at FilKONtario in 1998.

A book of songs by McQuillin, title The Cynthia McQuillin Songbook ("everything that Dr. Jim Robinson, Kristoph Klover & Margaret Davis, Harold Stein, Mary Creasey, Kay Shapero, Bob Kanefsky, Alan Thiesen, and Lee Gold could find in 2013") was compiled and published by Lee Gold in 2013, but is now out of print.

== Discography ==
- Crystal Singer - 1981
- Crystal Vision (with Phillip Wayne)
- Singer in the Shadow - 1983
- Minus Ten and Counting - 1983
- Shadow Spun - 1986
- Dark Moon Circle - 1987
- Moon Shadows - 1989, reissued by Shadowsinger Records
- Dreams of Fortune - 1991, reissued by Shadowsinger Records
- Midlife Crisis - performed by Midlife Crisis: Cynthia McQuillin and Dr. Jane Robinson
- Bedlam Cats - 1992 - performed by Midlife Crisis, plus Margaret Davis, Kristoph Klover, Patrick McKenna, and Sharon Williams
- Uncharted Stars - 1993
- This Heavy Heart - 1994
- Witch's Dance - 1998

== Bibliography ==
A partial list of McQuillin's published short stories. This list includes only professional publications, not the many that were published in fanzines.

- Cat's World - CATFANTASTIC 3, DAW Books 1994
- The Chieri's Godchild - SNOWS OF DARKOVER, DAW 1994
- Daelith's Bargain - Sword and Sorceress 13, DAW 1996
- Deep as Rivers - SWORD AND SORCERESS 17, DAW, 2000
- The Exterminator - Marion Zimmer Bradley's Fantasy Magazine #37, Autumn 1997
- The Forest - THE KEEPER'S PRICE, DAW 1980
- Humphrey's Dilemma - MZB's Fantasy Magazine #29, Autumn 1995
- Leaves of Iron - SWORD AND SORCERESS 20, DAW, 200
- The Mages of Carthia - MZB's Fantasy Magazine, issue 21, Fall 1993
- The Mage Who Dreamed of Gryphons - MZB's Fantasy Magazine, issue 26, Summer 1995
- MZBeans (a soup) & Spiderfish Stew - Serve It Forth: Cooking with Anne McCaffrey ISBN 0446671614
- Parri's Blade - SWORD AND SORCERESS 21, DAW, 2004
- Seliki - SUCH A PRETTY FACE, Meisha Merlin, 2000
- Shadow Harper - SWORD AND SORCERESS 12, DAW 1995
- Space Station Annie - SPACE OPERA, DAW Dec 1996
- The Stone-weaver's Tale - SWORD AND SORCERESS 14, DAW Mar 1997
- Toyen - MARION ZIMMER BRADLEY'S FANTASY WORLDS, Sep 1998
- Virgin Spring - SWORD AND SORCERESS 11, DAW 1994
- Waking the Stone Maiden - SWORD AND SORCERESS 16, DAW, 1999
- Whistle the Wind - MZB's Fantasy Magazine #38, Winter 1998

== Honors ==
=== Pegasus Awards ===
- 1999 Best Writer/Composer
- 2006 Best Writer/Composer (awarded posthumously)

=== Pegasus Nominations ===
- 1987 Best Filk Song, "Crimson and Crystal"
- 1988 Best Writer/Composer
- 1989 Best Writer/Composer
- 1991 Best War/Vengeance Song, "The Tyrant's Tale"
- 1992 Best Writer/Composer
- 1993 Best Filk Song, "I Would Walk With You"
- 1993 Best Writer/Composer
- 1996 Best Filk Song, "Black Davie's Ride"
- 1997 Best Writer/Composer
- 1997 Best Sorcery Song, "Crimson and Crystal"
- 1999 (w/ Jordin Kare) Best Fool Song, "Fool to Feed the Drive"
- 2004 Best Classic Filk Song, "Black Davie's Ride"
- 2006 Best Writer/Composer
- 2007 Best Classic Filk Song, "Black Davie's Ride"
- 2008 Best Tragedy Song, "Black Davie's Ride"

=== Convention Honors ===
- Baycon, 1991: Special Guest of Honor (Filk)
- OVFF, 1991: Guest of Honor
- Fourplay, January 31-February 2, 1992: Guest
- Conterpoint Too!, June 21–23, 1996: invited but unable to attend
- ConFurence 10, April 1–4, 1999: Guest of Honor (along with Mary Hanson-Roberts, artist)
- FilKONtario, 2003: Guest of Honor (along with Dr. Jane Robinson)
- Fourplay (UK national filk convention #4), 1992 Guest of Honor (along with Dr. Jane Robinson)
- Marcon 39, 2004: Filk Guest of Honor (along with Dr. Jane Robinson)
