= Talis Kimberley =

British singer-songwriter

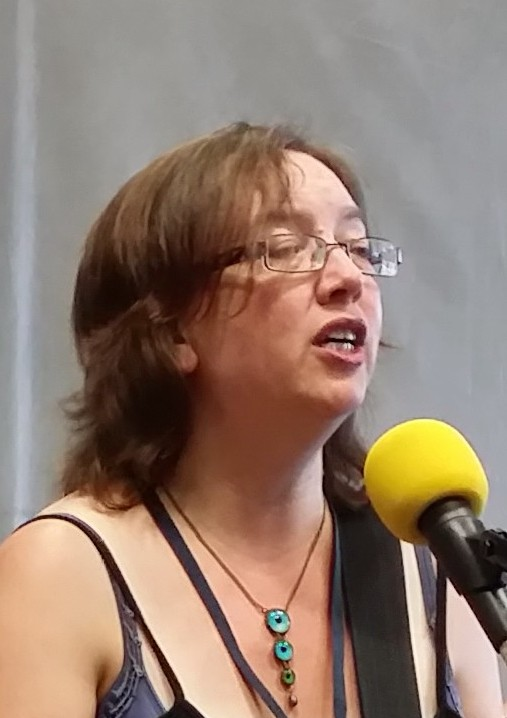
- Kimberley in 2014
- Occupations: singer-songwriter; activist; political figure
- Musical career
- Genres: Folk; filk

Talis Kimberley is an English folk singer-songwriter, activist, and political figure based in Wiltshire, England. Her songs are narrative in nature and feature a mixture of mythology, environmental issues and everyday life approached from unexpected angles, among other things. She performs as a solo artist or with her floating band (formerly Mythical Beasts), and is managed by Marchwood Media. She has been an active contributor to the Occupy movement, and in 2015, was the parliamentary candidate for the Green Party for the South Swindon constituency, winning 1,757 votes.

== Music ==
Kimberley has been an active musician on the filk music circuit since 1990, playing in the UK, Germany, Canada and the United States. She has been a Guest of Honour at VIbraphone (1994) – UK; FilKONtario (1997) – Canada; OVFF (2000), Consonance (2003), DucKon 19 (2010), MarCon (2017) – USA; and FilkCONtinental (2006) – Germany. She was also Guest at DraCon, Bristol (1992) and "Featured Filker" at Boskone, USA (1995).

=== Pegasus Awards ===
Talis has been nominated for 32 Pegasus Awards and of those nominations has received nine awards:

Year	Category	Song
2014	Best Song	Paper Worlds (tie)
2013	Best Writer/Composer	
2009	Best Classic Song	Still Catch the Tide
2008	Best Classic Song	Archetype Café
2007	Best Writer/Composer	
2006	Best Torch Song	X-Libris
2002	Best Filk Song	Velvet
2001	Best Performer	
2001	Best Writer/Composer	

=== Discography ===
- Eleanor Roosevelt's Knitting – Songs of Yarncraft and Spinning (2016) – (10 tracks. Marchwood Media)
- Cloth of Gold – Tales of Sheep and Farming (2016) – (11 tracks. Marchwood Media)
- Alchemical Wedding (2013) – (4 tracks. With John Jones, Kieran Taaffe and Steve Paine. A collaborative album featuring music by Talis Kimberley and LEGEND. It was produced for Greenmantle Magazine's 20th Anniversary edition.)
- Queen of Spindles (2012) – (14 tracks. Marchwood Media)
- Green Places (2011) – (6 tracks presented free with Greenmantle Magazine)
- The Hearth and the Hive (2010) – (12 tracks. Marchwood Media)
- Archetype Café (2000) – (12 tracks. Marchwood Media)
- About Damn Time (2000) – (4 tracks. Marchwood Media)
- Wolves & Changelings (1993). (12 tracks. Marchwood Media)
- Mythical Beasts Undubbed – with John Jones and Kieran Taaffe (4 Tracks. Original release 1996, Tarot Moon Productions; re-released as Mythical Beasts Unplugged 1999, Marchwood Media).
- Icarus' Sister (1994), (3 tracks. Tarot Moon Productions)
- Ancient Sky/ The Toad aka SkyToad – joint album with Zander Nyrond (1993), (21 track. Tarot Moons Productions/ Home Cooking Productions)
- (Almost) Live at DRACON (1993), (15 tracks, limited edition not released under label)
- Uffington Hill (1993), (3 tracks. Tarot Moon Productions)
- Pentatalics (1993) – with Zander Nyrond and 'The Scarlet Fiddler' (15 tracks. Tarot Moon Productions)

==== Album contributor ====
In addition to releasing her own albums, Kimberley has also worked as an album contributor:

- Pagan Folk Against Fascism (2010) – Pagan Folk Against Fascism; Contributor: Track 13 – 1400 Hours
- FilkCONtinental 1999–2000: The Programme Has Changed (2004) – Edition PEGASUS; Contributor: Tracks 1. Marchwood and 21. Tattercoats.
- Why Can't Penguins Filk?: Songs from FilKONtario 7 (2003) – ADC Studios; Contributor: Tracks 3. Mandolins, 7. Belladonna Pie, 11. The Alchemist's Landlady, and 20. Death Danced at My Party.

==== Guest musician ====
Her guest musician appearances on other albums include:

- Playing Rapunzel – Abseiling for Beginners (2009); Track: The Beat of Drums (bouzouki)
- Zander Nyrond – Wassaliens and Other Unexpected Noises (1999); Tracks: Mimsey Were The Borogroves and Alchemy.
- Mary Ellen Wessels – Current Obsessions (1996); Track: She is Always There (harmony vocals)
- Phoenix – Dancing Flames (1991); Track: Ceinwen's Bow (written by Talis Kimberley)

=== Covers ===
Several of Talis Kimberley's songs have been covered by other musicians and ensembles including Kathy Mar, Zander Nyrond, Musical Chairs, Rika Körte, Judith Hayman, Harmony Heifers, Seanan McGuire, Dandelion Wine and Playing Rapunzel.

=== Notable performances ===
Kimberley has performed in many and varying settings during the course of her career. She appeared at the Schlendrian Folk Bar (2000), Glastonbury Festival (1995) and the Bristol Community Festival (several years in the 1990s). She was part of Festival at the Edge 2012, Treefest 2011 and 2012, and the Little Green Gathering 2013. Kimberley was the Songwriter in Residence at the 2013 Havant Literary Festival. She was also one of the acts, along with Jethro Tull's Ian Anderson, who took part in a charity fundraiser to allow the village of Wroughton to purchase Kings Farm Wood.

== Politics ==
Kimberley is an active member of the Green Party, having stood in the 2014 local elections as the Swindon Area Green Party candidate for Wroughton Ward of Swindon Borough Council. Previously serving as Press Officer, in 2015 she was the party's candidate for the South Swindon parliamentary constituency, and received the fewest votes (1,757 votes / 3.6% of the total vote). She stood again in the 2017 election and received 747 votes (1.5%).

Kimberley also served as a member of Wroughton Parish Council for several years, including as Chair of the Environment and Road Traffic committee, and then was twice elected chair of the council. She is currently an independent councillor on Wroughton Parish Council.

== Other interests ==
As well as having had lyrics for her songs published in various filk songbooks, Kimberley has contributed to publications and co-created the comic strip Zen Zebras. Kimberley has also appeared in the ITV West TV Documentary 'Highly Illogical' (2003) and made guest appearances on radio shows including the Prairie Ceilidh radio show in Canada.
