= Technical Difficulties =

Technical difficulties are unforeseen equipment problems such as hardware failures or software bugs that make it difficult or impossible to perform a desired action.

Technical difficulties or Technical Difficulties may also refer to:

- Technical Difficulties (filk group)
- Technical Difficulties (Racer X album)
- Technical Difficulties (Training for Utopia album)
- The Technical Difficulties, a semi-educational, comedic and satirical podcast and video team made up of Tom Scott, Natalie Gray, Gary Brannan, and Chris Joel.
- Technical Difficulties Radio, also referred to as Technical Difficulties, a series of livestreams and songs by Brockhampton.
