= Maya Kaathryn Bohnhoff =

American sci-fi and fantasy author (born 1954)

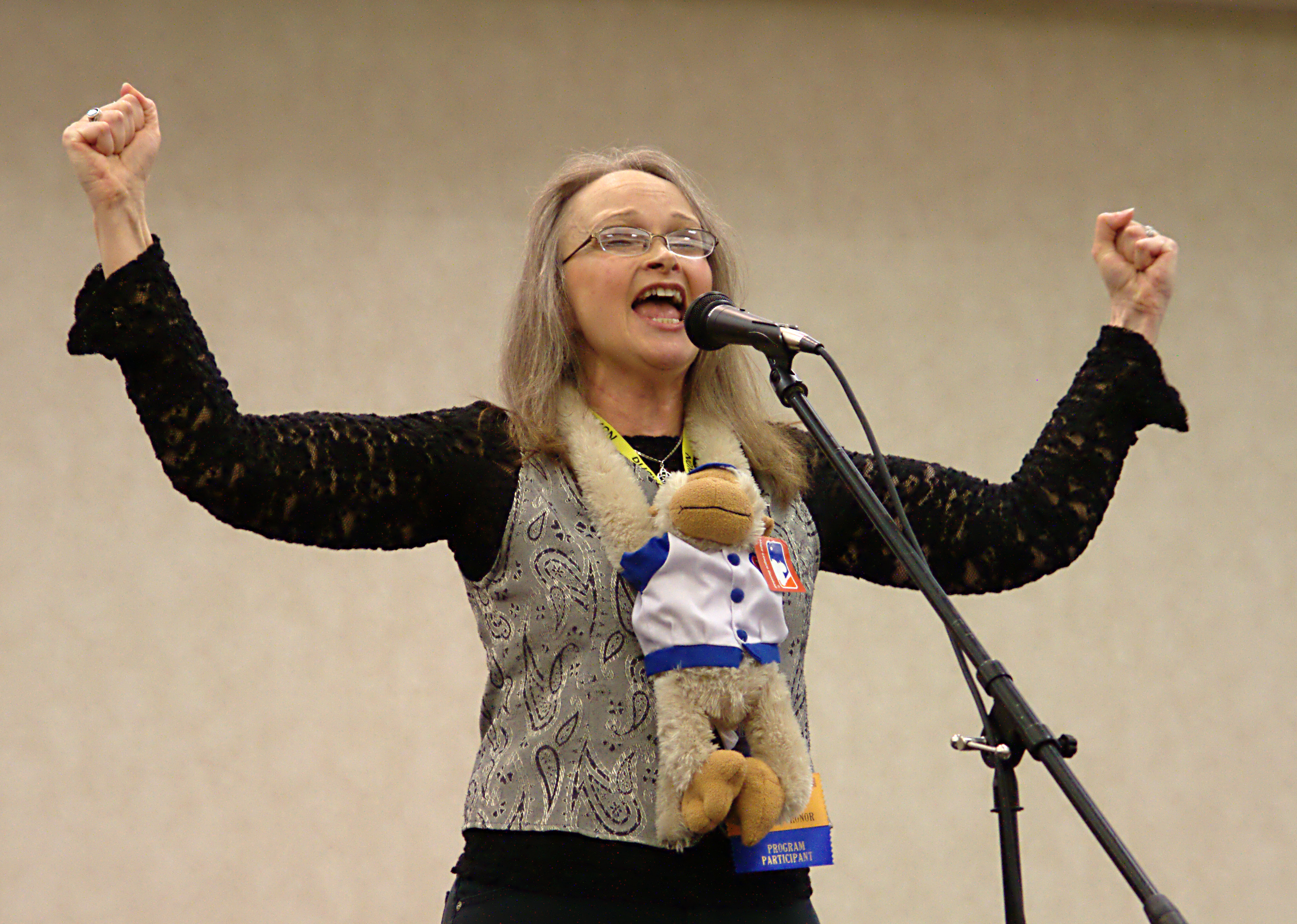
- Performing at DucKon 2008
- Born: 1954 (age 71–72); California, U.S.
- Occupations: Writer, musician
- Writing career
- Genres: Science fiction; fantasy
- Website: www.mysticfig.com

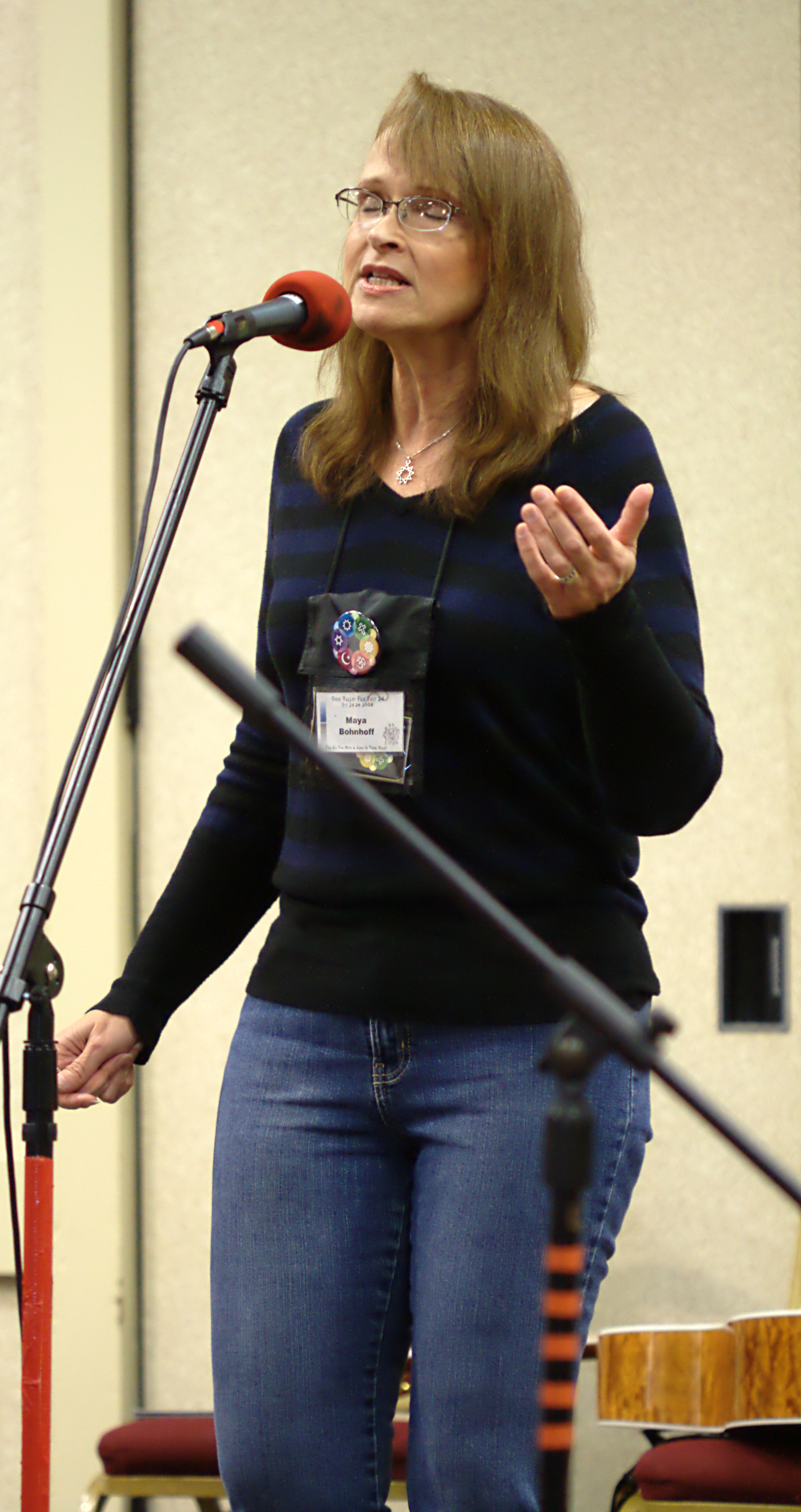
Maya Bohnhoff at Ohio Valley Filk Fest, 2008

Maya Kaathryn Bohnhoff (born 1954) is an American sci-fi and fantasy author and filk musician. As an author, she collaborated on several novels in the Batman and Star Wars franchise with Michael Reaves, and as a filk musician, she is a three-time Pegasus Award winner.

== Early life ==
Bohnhoff's interest in science fiction began after watching The Day the Earth Stood Still as a child. Her mother was a singer, and music was her predominant passion throughout her high school and college days.

== Writing ==
Bohnhoff has written short stories and novelettes for a range of magazines, including Analog magazine, Interzone, Amazing Stories, Realms of Fantasy, Jim Baen's Universe, and others. Much of her writing is strongly influenced by her Baháʼí Faith and other religions. Her story The White Dog was a finalist for the 1999 BSFA award. Cruel and Unusual Punishment was included in the e-book anthology Infinite Sky, Infinite God, which won the 2007 EPPIE award. The story "O, Pioneer" was a finalist for the 2006 Sidewise Award for Alternate History.

She has also written several full-length novels, including The Meri, which became a trilogy, has been published twice (1992 and 2005), and was a finalist for Locus magazine's 1993 award for Best First Novel. In 2018 Pegasus Books published The Antiquities Hunter: A Gina Miyoko Mystery, the first in a series of private detective novels.

Bohnhoff has also contributed to professional writing magazines and online presentations.

== Music ==
Bohnhoff's music career began in 1980 as a member of a progressive rock band called Talisman. With her husband Jeff Bohnhoff, she later formed the band Syntax, releasing a cassette tape, Silent Planet, in 1990. They were introduced to filk music in 1991, performing at a 1991 science fiction convention where Bohnhoff was nominated for a Nebula Award. They were later invited by Kathy Mar to perform at the 1995 Baycon.

Bohnhoff and her husband now have their own production company, MysticFig, and perform mostly as a duo, appearing at Norwescon, Worldcon, LepreCon, OryCon, the Ohio Valley Filk Fest and others. They have produced four CDs through their production company.

== Personal life ==
Bohnhoff has been married since 1981 to Jeff Bohnhoff, and they have three children. The family are members of the Baháʼí Faith.

== Bibliography ==
- "But my mother was a singer", In Michael Fitzgerald (ed.). The creative circle : art, literature and music in Bahá'í perspective. Kalimat Press, 1989.
- "Hand-Me-Down Town" (Analog, 1989)
- "A Little Bit of an Eclipse" (Analog, 1990)
- "Blythe Magic" (Analog, 1990)
- "Heroes" (Analog, 1990)
- "Shaman" (Analog, 1990)
- "Hobbits" (Analog, 1991 / Hobbits, Halflings, Warrows & Wee Folkd, Questar 1993)
- "Home Is Where..." (Analog, 1991)
- "If It Ain't Broke..." (Analog, 1991)
- "The Devil His Due" (Amazing Stories, 1991)
- "The Doctor's Wife" (Analog, 1992)
- The Meri (Baen, 1992, Sense of Wonder Press, James A. Rock & Co., Pub. 2005) (first of The Meri trilogy) ISBN 0-671-72115-1
- "An End to Writer's Block" (Writer's Digest, 1992)
- "A Tear in the Mind's Eye" (Analog, 1993)
- "Squatter's Rights" (Analog, 1993)
- "Taco Del and the Fabled Tree of Destiny" (Amazing Stories, 1993)
- Taminy (Baen, 1993) (second of The Meri trilogy) ISBN 0-671-72174-7
- "The Boy Who Loved Clouds" (Amazing Stories, 1993)
- "As the Angels in Heaven" (Analog, 1995)
- The Crystal Rose (Baen, 1995) (third of The Meri trilogy) ISBN 0-671-87648-1
- "The Secret Life of Gods" (Analog, 1995)
- "The Sons of the Fathers" (Century, 1995)
- "Marsh Mallow" (Analog, 1996)
- The Spirit Gate (Baen, 1996)
- "Ask Arlen" (Analog, 1997)
- "Content with the Mysterious" (Analog, 1997)
- "Doctor Dodge" (Interzone, 1997)
- "Pipe Dreams" (Analog, 1997)
- "Dialogue and Characterization" (The Writer, 1997, The Writer's Handbook, 1998)
- "Beggars Might Ride" (Interzone, 1998)
- "Silver Lining" (Interzone, 1998)
- "Who Have No Eyes" (Interzone, 1998)
- "White Dog" (Interzone, 1999)
- "Taming the Fictional Wilds" (Fiction Writer Magazine, 1999)
- "Any Mother's Son" (Analog, 2000)
- "A Hole in Her Head" (Realms of Fantasy, 2001)
- "Cruel and Unusual Punishment" (Interzone, 2002, and Infinite Sky, Infinite God. anthology, 2006) (2007 EPPIE award-winner)
- Magic Time: Angelfire (with Marc Zicree) (Eos, 2002) ISBN 978-0-06-105069-5
- "Distance" (Analog, 2003)
- "O, Pioneer" (Paradox, 2005)
- "Dabbling in Magic" (Speculations, 2005)
- Hackoff.com a blook (Bohnhoff was the editor) by Tom Evslin.
- "Willies" (Analog, 2006)
- "The Nature of Things" (Jim Baen's Universe, 2006)
- Mr. Twilight - (with Michael Reaves) (Del Rey, 2006)
- Batman: Fear Itself (Batman Novel with Michael Reaves) (Del Rey and DC Comics, 2007)
- "Junkie" Analog 128/7&8 (Jul/Aug 2008) : 134–143
- "The Resident" (Jim Baen's Universe, Summer 2009)
- Star Wars: Coruscant Nights III-Patterns of Force — (with Michael Reaves) (Del Rey/Lucasbooks, 2009) New York Times Bestseller at #16
- Laldasa: Beloved Slave (Book View Press, 2009)
- Taco Del and the Fabled Tree of Destiny (Book View Press, 2010)
- A Princess of Passyunk Book View Press, 2010)
- "Simple Gifts" Analog (Jan/Feb 2010)
- Star Wars: Shadow Games (with Michael Reaves) (Del Rey/Lucasbooks, 2011) New York Times Bestseller at #25
- Shamam (a collection of science fiction short stories from Analog magazine, Book View Press, 2012)
- Star Wars: The Last Jedi (with Michael Reaves) (Del Rey/Lucasbooks, 2013) New York Times Bestseller at #11
- The Antiquities: A Gina Miyoko Mystery (Pegasus Books, 2018)

== Discography ==
- Silent Planet (1990) (cassette) (with Syntax)
- Retro Rocket Science (2001)
- Manhattan Sleeps (2002)
- Aliens Ate My Homework (2003) - Bohnhoffs' song Knights in White Satin won the 2003 Pegasus Awards for Best Writer/Composer, the Cat Faber Best Parody, by the Ohio Valley Filk Fest concom.
- Harmony Heifers (2005) - won the 2005 Pegasus Award for Best Performers
- Möbius Street (2009)
- Grated Hits (2010)
- I Remember The Rain (2016)
- Schrödinger's Hairball (2018)
