= James Robinson (filk musician) =

American singer-songwriter

Dr. James Robinson (born 1948, Maine) is an American filk music songwriter and performer (known as Dr. Jane Robinson prior to 2004 sex reassignment surgery) whose songs focus on scientific themes, particularly paleontology.

Robinson earned a doctorate in biology from UCLA in 1976, and went on to teach at the University of California, Berkeley.

His filk albums include Dr. Jane's Science Notes (later reissued as Wackademia), Fossil Fever, Bedlam Cats, Midlife Crisis and Dr. Jane's Remains.

Robinson has won two Pegasus Awards (2000, Best End of the World Song, for "Out of a Clear Blue Sky"; and 1992, Best Writer/Composer); and has been nominated an additional 14 times. Robinson was inducted into the Filk Hall of Fame in 2000.

Robinson's life partner was the late Cynthia McQuillin, who reportedly said, upon meeting James for the first time, "At last I get to meet the man I fell in love with!" He lives in Oakland, California.

A book of songs by Robinson as "Dr. Jane", Dr. Jane's Songs ("all of Dr. Jane's songs that Dr. Jim Robinson could find in his archives, plus a few that Lee Gold found from other sources"), was compiled and published by Lee Gold in 2012.

== Guest of Honor appearances ==
Robinson has been a Guest of Honor (or similar position, e.g., Toastmaster) at over half a dozen conventions, including both filk-music-specific conventions:

- Counterpoint Too! (the second NEFilk con)
- FilKONtario 2003
- Consonance 1994 (Toastmaster, responsible for introducing other guests but also entertaining the membership with a concert performance),

and non-filk conventions:

- Marcon 39
- Capricon XXIV
- Norwescon XVII
