= Bill Roper (filker) =

American filker and publisher

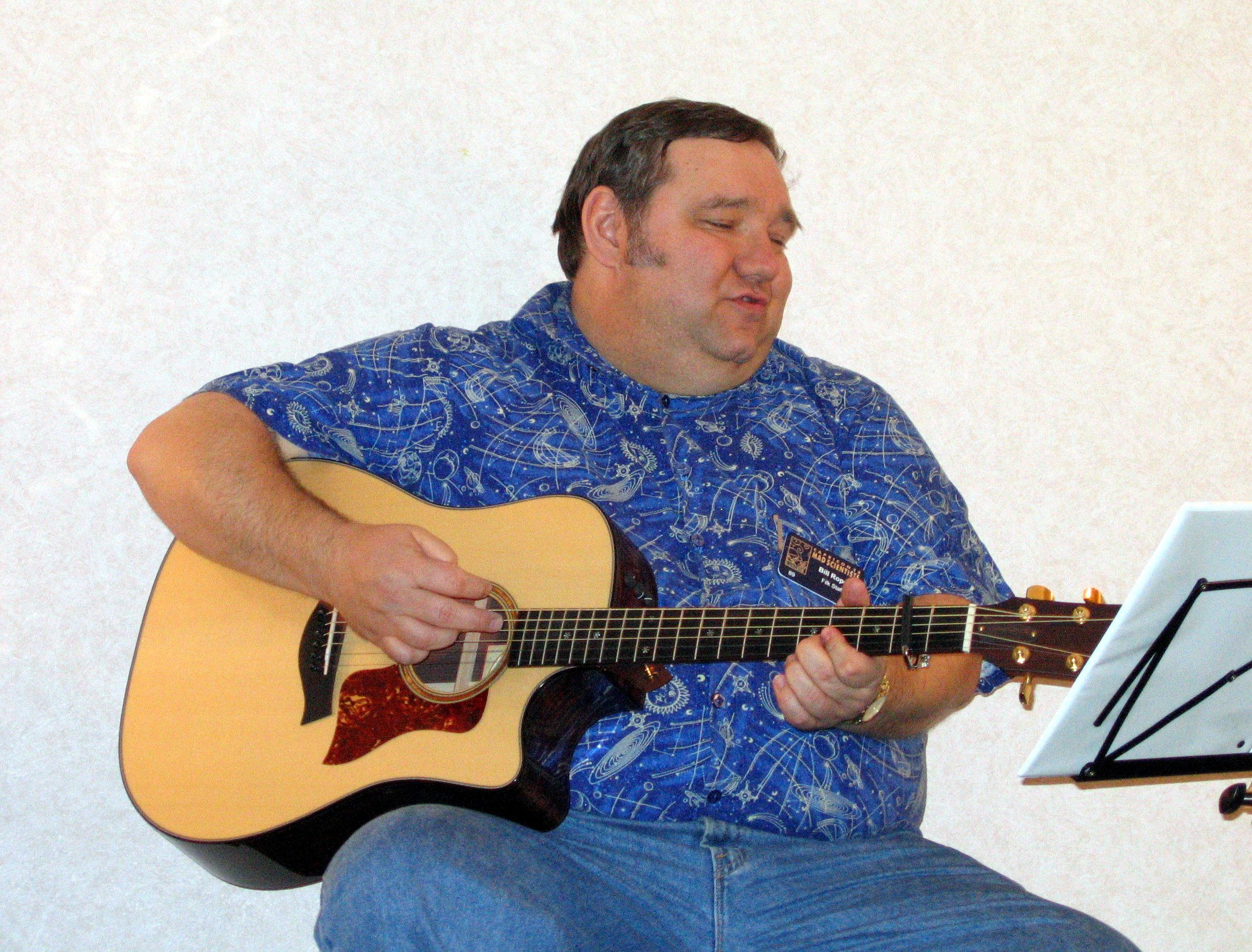
- Bill Roper at Capricon 2005

Background information
- Born: May 23, 1956 (age 69)
- Genres: Filk
- Instrument: Guitar
- Labels: Dodeka
- Website: www.filker.com

Bill Roper (born May 23, 1956) is a filker and member of science fiction fandom. Roper co-founded Dodeka Records with his wife, Gretchen, received the Pegasus Award three times, and was inducted into the Filk Hall of Fame in 2000. He has chaired the Windycon science fiction convention twice as well as Whatcon and worked on Chicon IV, Chicon V, and Chicon 2000, the last as the head of the Exhibits Division.

Roper is a longtime board member of ISFiC and since 2004, he has been the business manager for ISFiC Press.

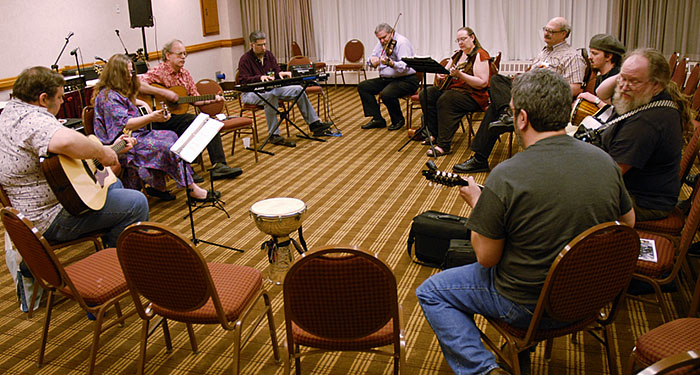
Roper (far left) playing in a filk circle.

== Pegasus Awards ==
- Best Schtick 1987: Unreality Warp/Kinda Mediocre, Actually (with Clif Flynt)
- Best Filk Song 1988: "Wind from Rainbow's End"
- Best Original Humorous Song 2003: "My Husband the Filker" (with Gretchen Roper)
