= Anne Passovoy =

Anne Passovoy is active in science fiction fandom and filk music, and has won two Pegasus Awards. She is married to Bob Passovoy. She has written many filk songs, including "Marcon Ballroom" and writing perhaps the most widely sung tune for Poul Anderson's poem, "Mary O'Meara."

Robert A. Heinlein in part dedicated his 1982 novel Friday to Anne.

Along with her husband, she was the Fan Guest of Honor at Chicon 2000. Anne and Bob Passovoy were inducted into the Filk Hall of Fame in 2008.
