= Three Weird Sisters (band) =

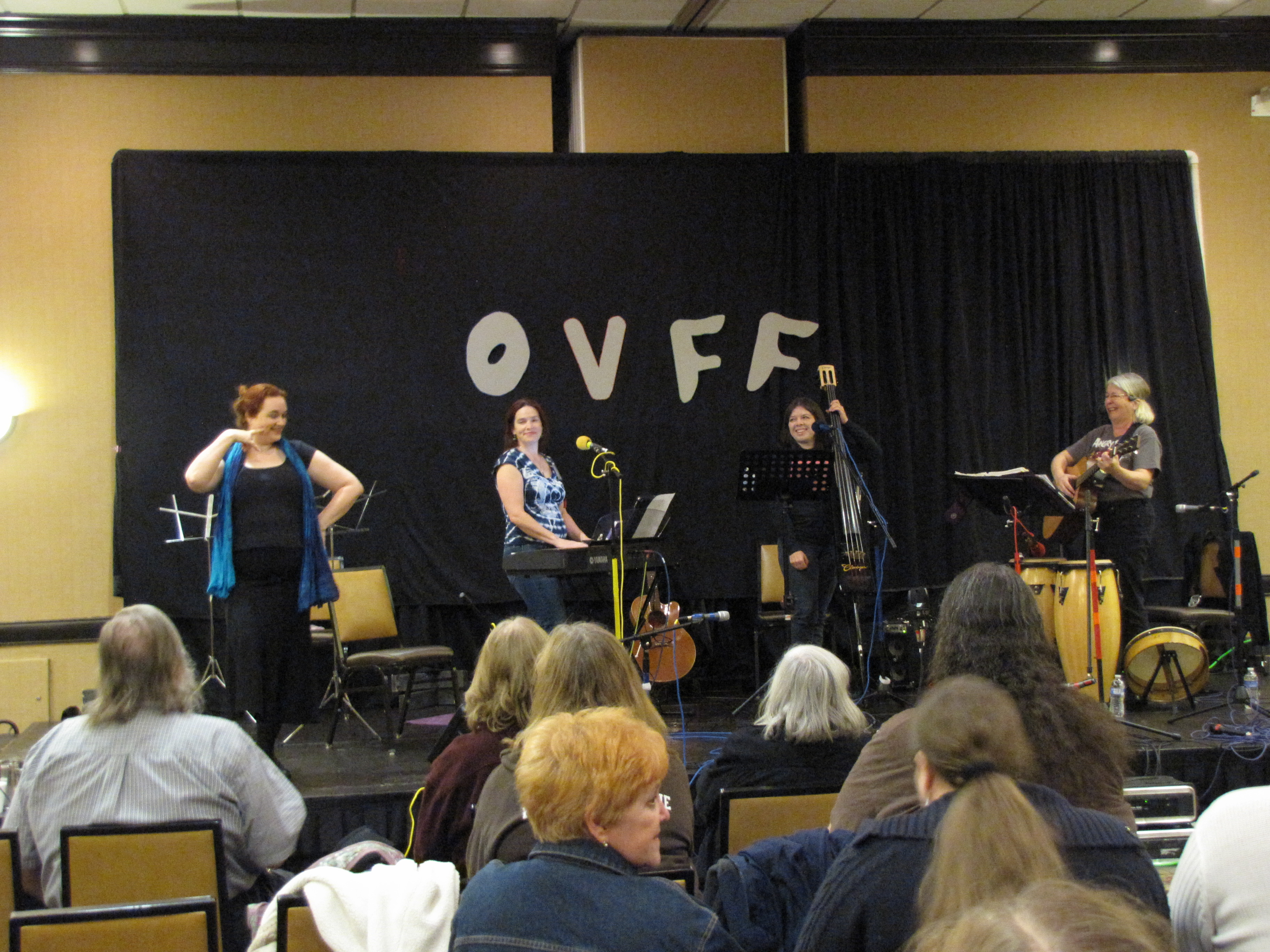
- The band at Ohio Valley Filk Fest 2012.

Background information
- Origin: Atlanta, Georgia
- Genres: Filk
- Labels: Bedlam House
- Members: Mary Crowell; Brenda Sinclair Sutton; Teresa Gibson Powell; Gwen Knighton
- Website: http://www.threeweirdsisters.com

Three Weird Sisters is a band from Atlanta, Georgia. The group performs filk music (science fiction/fantasy folk music) with harp, double bass, guitar, and bodhran accompaniment. Their albums include Hair of the Frog and Rite the First Time.

The original members consisted of Gwen Knighton, Brenda Sinclair Sutton and Teresa Gibson Powell. In 2004 Knighton married Joe Raftery and moved to live with him in England. Mary Crowell joined the band late 2004, making it possible for the band to perform in Knighton's absence. However, Knighton still continues to collaborate with the band.

In 2002 the band won two Pegasus Awards for Best Performer and Best Chilling/Spine-Tingling Song with "In a Gown Too Blue", as well as being nominated for Best Song That Tells a Story with "Song of Fey Cross".

The group was approached by Warner Bros. for permission to use their name in the film Harry Potter and the Goblet of Fire, but negotiations were dropped when the Canadian band Wyrd Sisters sued the film studio to prevent the reference from being made.

== Discography ==
- Rite the First Time (August 2001)
- Hair of the Frog (September 2004)
- Third Thyme's the Charm (September 2012)
