= Heather Dale =

Canadian musician

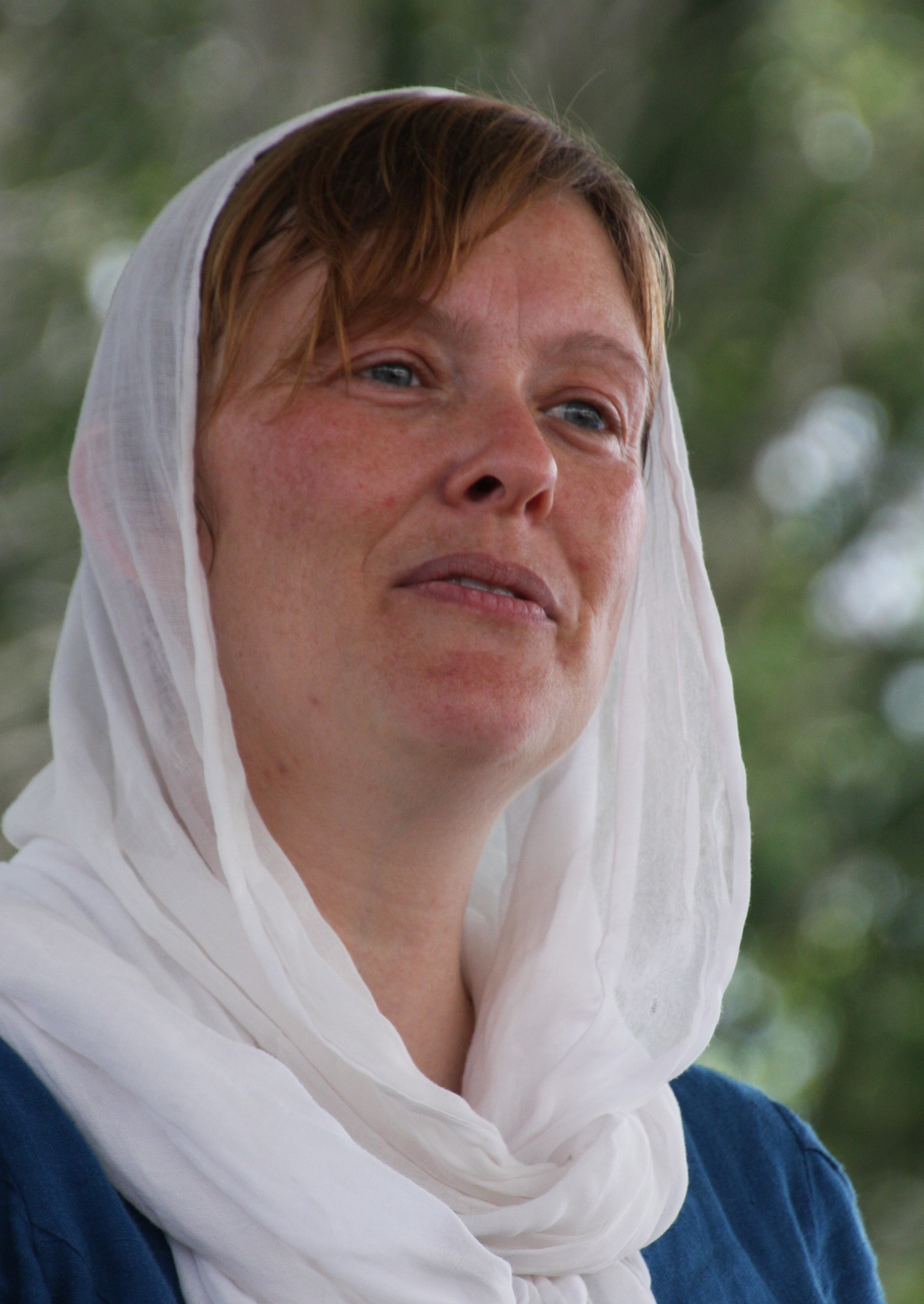
- Dale performing in historical costume

Background information
- Genres: Celtic; Folk; Filk
- Instruments: Singing; piano; bodhran; mountain dulcimer
- Years active: 1999–present
- Labels: Amphisbaena, MapleMusic, Audio & Video Labs

Heather Dale is a Canadian Celtic folk musician, author, entrepreneur, and filker who was inducted into the Canadian Science Fiction and Fantasy Association's Hall of Fame in 2020. Much of her music draws on Celtic and Arthurian legend, but she also incorporates influences and instruments from other genres, including world music. She runs her own independent record label, Amphis Music, from its office in Toronto, Ontario.

== Personal life ==
Heather Dale is the daughter of Peter and Nancy Dale. Her mother's family comes from Cornwall, though Dale describes herself as a "Celtic mongrel", with Scottish, Irish, and Welsh ancestry in addition to Cornish. She also has "family roots" in the west side of Ottawa. As of 2004, Dale was a member of the Toronto/Cornish Association. She was raised in Scarborough, and graduated from the University of Waterloo with a degree in environmental studies in the early-mid 1990s.

Dale's musical passion began with taking piano lessons and writing poetry as a child. This early exposure led to a familiarity with a wide variety of classical and folk instruments.

== Career ==
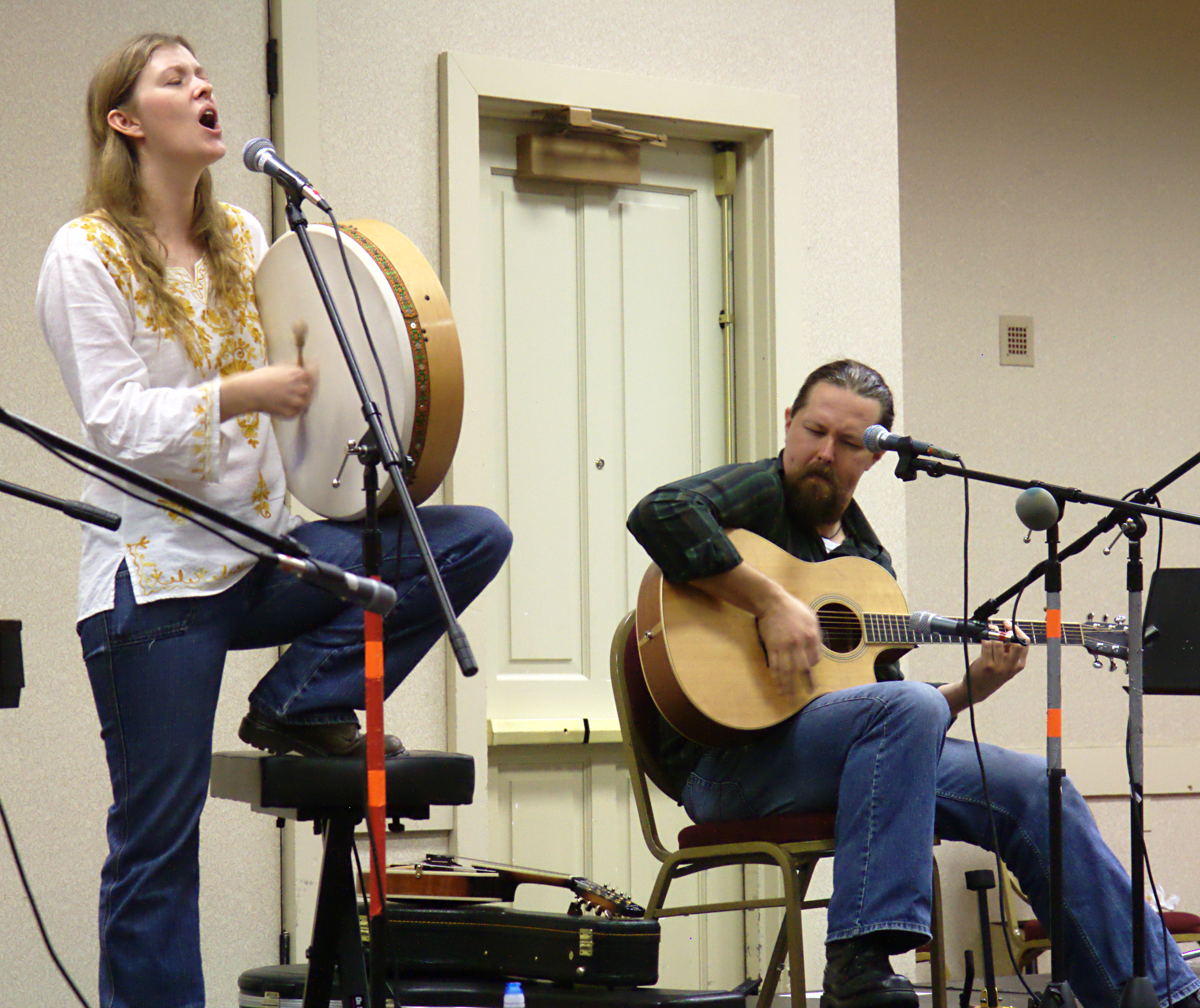
Dale playing a drum with Ben Deschamps on guitar at the 2009 Ohio Valley Filk Fest

At the age of eighteen, while a student at the University of Waterloo, she discovered Medievalism through the Society for Creative Anachronism, and began composing songs inspired by Arthurian legend and other fantasy books she had grown up enjoying. Soon after, she began going to science fiction conventions in Toronto, and there found a welcoming community. She made her very first recordings in 1992, and released her first album The Trial of Lancelot in 2000. Trial included her most popular song, "Mordred's Lullaby", which went viral after release and counted over twenty million views on YouTube as of August 2020.

As a teenager, she developed aspirations of living an independent, entrepreneurial life, modelled after what she could see Loreena McKennitt doing with her career. Dale founded Amphis Music (officially Amphisbaena Music) in 1998, and it has been her primary record label throughout her career.

As of 2004, she was touring with a four-piece backing band and giving solo shows.

Since around 2005, Dale has worked closely with multi-instrumentalist Ben Deschamps, who has co-written and co-produced with her for much of her career, as well as performing and touring with her as duo and as part of the "Heather Dale Band" (occasionally the "Heather Dale Trio") and providing instrumentation on her recordings. Dale and Deschamps spent a decade on the road together before moving back to Toronto in 2019, the year which marked 20 years as a professional musician, according to an interview Dale did to promote the release of her 20th album, Sphere (2019).

In 2006, Dale produced a songbook, The Legends of Arthur, which re-tells some Arthurian legends and provides sheet music for her songs from The Trial of Lancelot and May Queen albums. The songbook is illustrated by Martin Springett.

Deschamps made concert live-streaming platform Online Concert Thing in October 2019, as an option for musician friends who couldn't tour and who were left with no recourse after the earlier streaming service ConcertWindow shut down. As of August 2021, Dale is in charge of Artist & Customer Relations for the platform.

On April 3, 2014, the Globe and Mail listed her as number six on a list of "the top 10 Canadian entrepreneurial crowdfunding campaigns of the moment" for her Indiegogo campaign to fund "CELTIC AVALON", a self-described "big King-Arthur-themed touring show & concert DVD, and youth educational program." This campaign raised over US$56,000 and produced Dale and S. J. Tucker's original musical Queens of Avalon (2016), about the relationship between Guinevere (played by Tucker) and Morgan le Fay (played by Dale).

On August 25, 2020, Dale was inducted into the Canadian Science Fiction and Fantasy Association's Hall of Fame during that year's virtual Aurora Awards ceremony. Dale was the first musician to be inducted into the Hall of Fame since its establishment in 2014.

== Style and subject matter ==
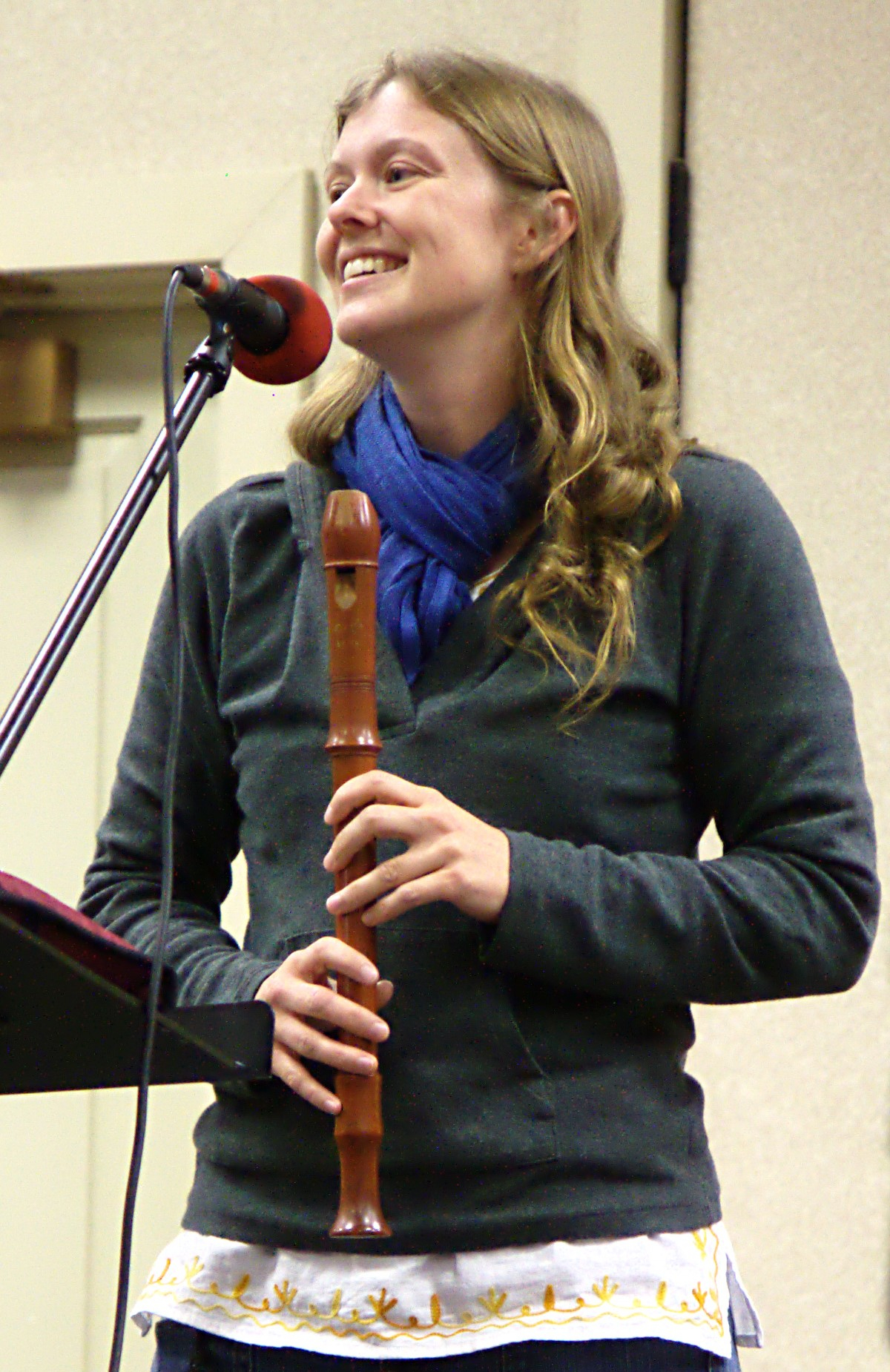
Dale with a recorder

Dale's music is frequently compared to Loreena McKennitt, and she cites McKennitt as an influence, because of her "multi-ethnic approach to modern Celtic music."

In analyzing Dale's portrayal of the Lady of Shalott in her song "Lily Maid", scholar Ann F. Howey notes that "in many of Dale's songs, the lyrics function as a dramatic monologue, so that Dale as a singer "speaks" in the persona of a particular character."^{:117}

Dale's early album The Trial of Lancelot (1999, with songs written between 1996 and 1999), features instrumentation that includes piano, guitars, flute, fiddle, cello, and various kinds of drums. Her instrumentation across her career has combined traditional Celtic instruments (Irish flute, tin whistle, bodhran) with rock-associated instruments (e.g. electric guitar) and instruments from world music, notably the didgeridoo and the udu. The nine songs on this album all draw on Arthurian legend. According to A Bibliography of Modern Arthuriana (1500–2000) (2006):

"The Lily Maid" consists of Elaine of Astolat's instructions to Lancelot. In "The Trial of Lancelot," various knights speak about Lancelot's guilt and fate, each one influenced by his own relationship to the knight; Lancelot's replies make up the chorus. In "Miles to Go," Guenevere voices her thoughts as she chooses to enter a nunnery. "The Prydwen Sails Again" is a song about the quest to Caer Siddi. "Mordred's Lullaby" is a haunting, disturbing lullaby sung by Morgan (here Mordred's mother) as she trains him from the cradle to seek revenge. "Hawthorn Tree" is the story of Merlin and Vivian, while "Culhwch and Olwen" retells that story [ie the story of Culhwch and Olwen]. "Tarnished Silver" is a song about Lancelot and Guenevere years later. The last song, "Measure of a Man," is about Arthur's death.

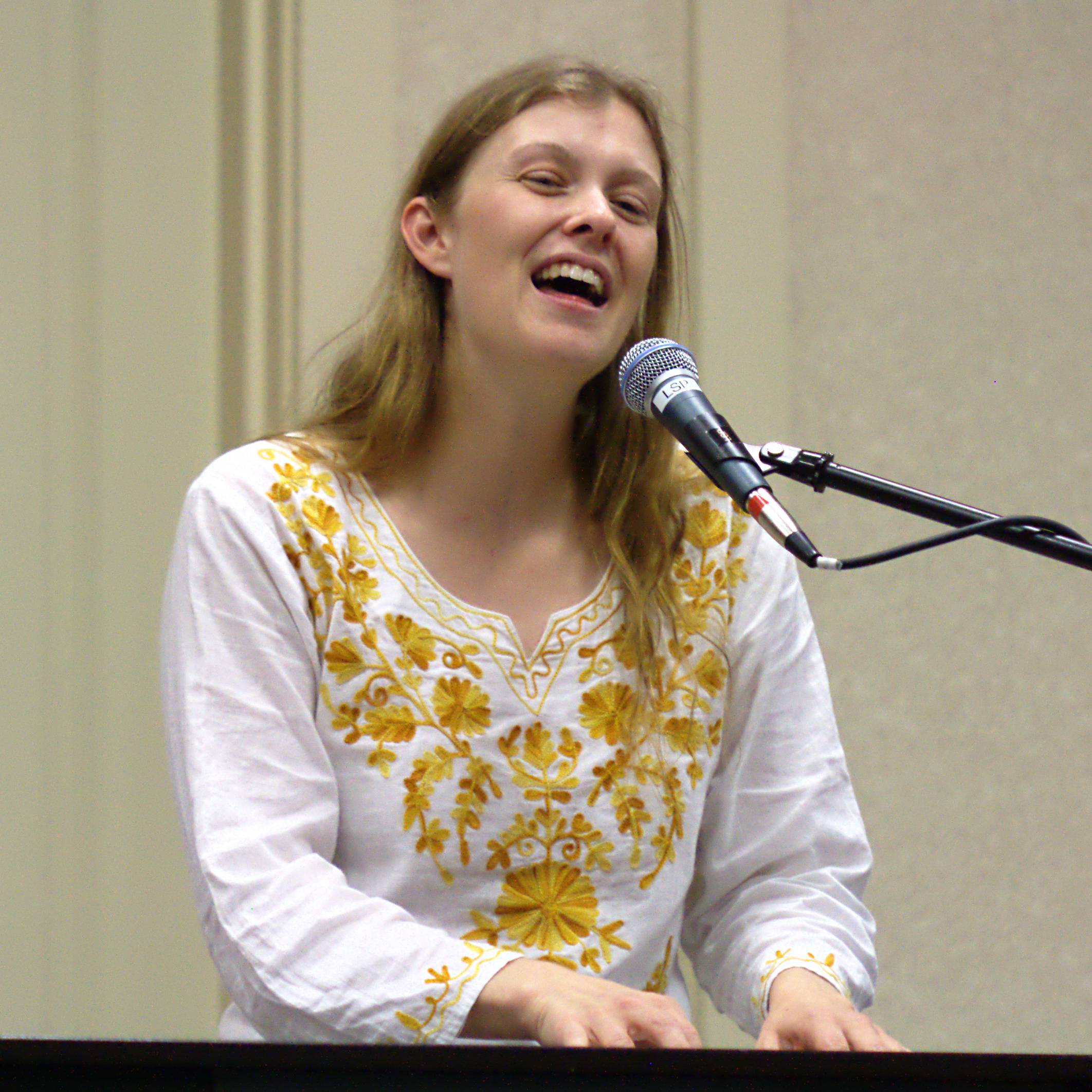
Dale playing a keyboard

May Queen (2003) also uses Arthurian legend as its primary subject matter. She re-recorded most of the songs from Trial and May Queen in her later album Avalon (2010).^{:122}

Call the Names (2001) has much barer instrumentation than Trial, and according to the BBC features "humorous and poignant" songs inspired by the everyday challenges of Renaissance life.

This Endris Night (2002) is a collection of medieval Christmas music, including the titular song. This Endris Night also includes a trilingual version of the "Huron Carol", a seventeenth century carol composed by Jesuit missionary Jean de Brébeuf at Sainte-Marie among the Hurons. Dale sings the song in Wyandot, French, and English. Dale's version uses different English lyrics than most other recordings, favouring a more accurate translation of the Wyandot words.

According to Alan M. Kent's 2007 essay "Towards a History of Popular Music in Cornwall, 1967–2007", Dale's music is "explicitly 'Celtic' and keenly Brythonic and Arthurian in theme." Kent identifies Dale as infusing Cornish popular music with "ethereal and soaring female vocalization," placing her in a genre also occupied by artists including Mary Black, Loreena McKennitt, Maire Brennan, and Enya. Despite Dale's inspiration by the Society for Creative Anachronism, Kent notes that throughout both The Trial of Lancelot and May Queen, she makes use of Cornish historical literary material, for instance the story of Tristan and Iseult (recounted in her song "Tristan and Isolt" on May Queen). She likewise draws on specifically Welsh stories. Her song about the legend of Culhwch and Olwen is, according to a 2011 essay by Megan MacAlystre, "one of only a handful of musical settings of the tale to be found", and is "among the most readily available"—the long legend of "how Culhwch won Olwen" is shortened into a "jaunty" five-minute-long song that stands out from what MacAlystre calls identifies as more familiar tales on the Trial of Lancelot album.

The Road to Santiago (2005) extends beyond the Celtic styles of her earlier albums, and includes influences from "jazz, art song, shanties, Spanish/North African rhythms and modal melodies, medieval court music and contemporary pop balladry," according to a review in the Toronto Star. The Road to Santiago also features the song "Sedna", a retelling of the Inuit creation myth involving the goddess Sedna that includes archival recordings of Inuit throat singing.

Her song "The Maiden and the Selkie" (from The Green Knight (2009)) is an example of her drawing on Norse and Celtic folklore, both in style (as a sea shanty) and subject matter (the song is about a romance between a woman and a male Selkie).

Her album Sphere (2019) draws inspiration from the Me Too movement and Time's Up. Stylistically, Sphere also draws on world music motifs, as well as ambient music.

== Influence ==
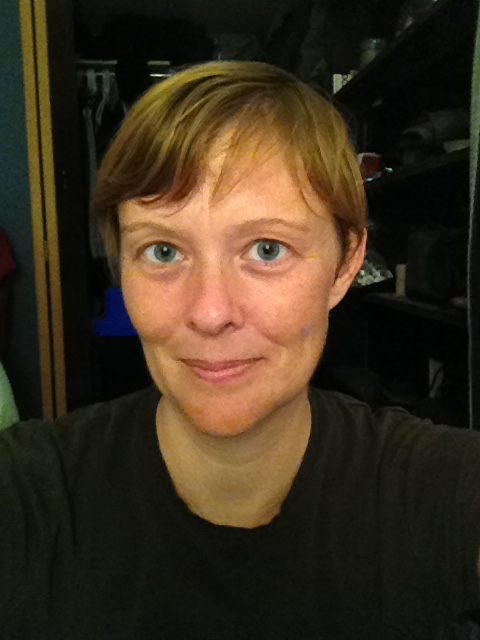
Dale in 2016

Dale's lyrics are quoted in many of the novels in S. M. Stirling's The Emberverse series, including The Sword of the Lady (2009), The High King of Montival (2010), The Tears of the Sun (2011), Lord of Mountains (2012), The Given Sacrifice (2013), The Golden Princess (2014), The Desert and the Blade (2015), and Prince of Outcasts (2016).

Tanya Huff's novel The Wild Ways (2011) is dedicated to Dale, "who sang about Selkies and started the whole thing".

Fellow filker and author Seanan McGuire states in the acknowledgements to her novel Chimes at Midnight (2013), that Dale's album Fairytale was a part of her "soundtrack" while writing the novel.

Author E. K. Johnston cites her music as an inspiration for her novels The Story of Owen: Dragon Slayer of Trondheim (2014) and Prairie Fire (2015), and quotes the lyrics to "Joan" (a song about Joan of Arc from the 2008 album The Gabriel Hounds) in the latter novel.

== Discography ==
=== Albums ===
- Dances by the Marian Ensemble (1996)
- The Trial of Lancelot (copyright 1999, released 2000)^{:122}
- Call the Names (2001)
- This Endris Night (2002)
- May Queen (2003)
- The Road to Santiago (Amphis/MapleMusic, 2005)
- The Hidden Path (2006)
- The Gabriel Hounds (2008)
- The Green Knight (2009)
- Avalon (2010)
- Fairytale (2011)
- My Celtic Heart (2013)
- Perpetual Gift (2012) – A free sample album released digitally on Dale's website
- Imagineer (Audio & Video Labs, Inc., 2015)
- Queens of Avalon (2016) – Cast recording of an original musical by Dale and S. J. Tucker
- Spark (2017)
- Sphere (2019)
- Source of the Sea (2020)
- Endless (2020)
- Incantations I (2021)
- Incantations II (2021)
- Incantations 3 (2021)

== Awards and nominations ==
Award	Year	Recipient(s) and nominee(s)	Category	Result	Ref.
Pegasus Awards	2005	Herself	Best Writer/Composer	Nominated	
Pegasus Awards	2005	Herself	Best Performer	Nominated	
Pegasus Awards	2008	Herself	Best Performer	Nominated	
Pegasus Awards	2009	Heather Dale and Ben Deschamps	Best Performer	Won	
Pegasus Awards	2010	Herself	Best Writer/Composer	Won	
Pegasus Awards	2011	"Joan", Heather Dale and Ben Deschamps	Best Filk Song	Nominated	
Pegasus Awards	2011	"As I Am"	Best Romantic Song	Won	
Pegasus Awards	2013	"Joan", Heather Dale and Ben Deschamps	Best Filk Song	Won	
Pegasus Awards	2018	"The Road to Santiago"	Best Road Trip Song	Won	
Pegasus Awards	2020	"Mordred's Lullaby"	Best Filk Song	Won	
Aurora Awards	2004	May Queen	Other Work in English	Nominated	
Aurora Awards	2007	The Hidden Path	Other Work in English	Nominated	
Aurora Awards	2012	"Skeleton Woman", Heather Dale and Ben Deschamps	Poem or Song	Nominated	
Aurora Awards	2012	Fairytale	Related Work	Nominated	
Aurora Awards	2020	Herself	Hall of Fame	Won	

== See also ==
- List of University of Waterloo people
