= Pegasus Award =

Filk music award

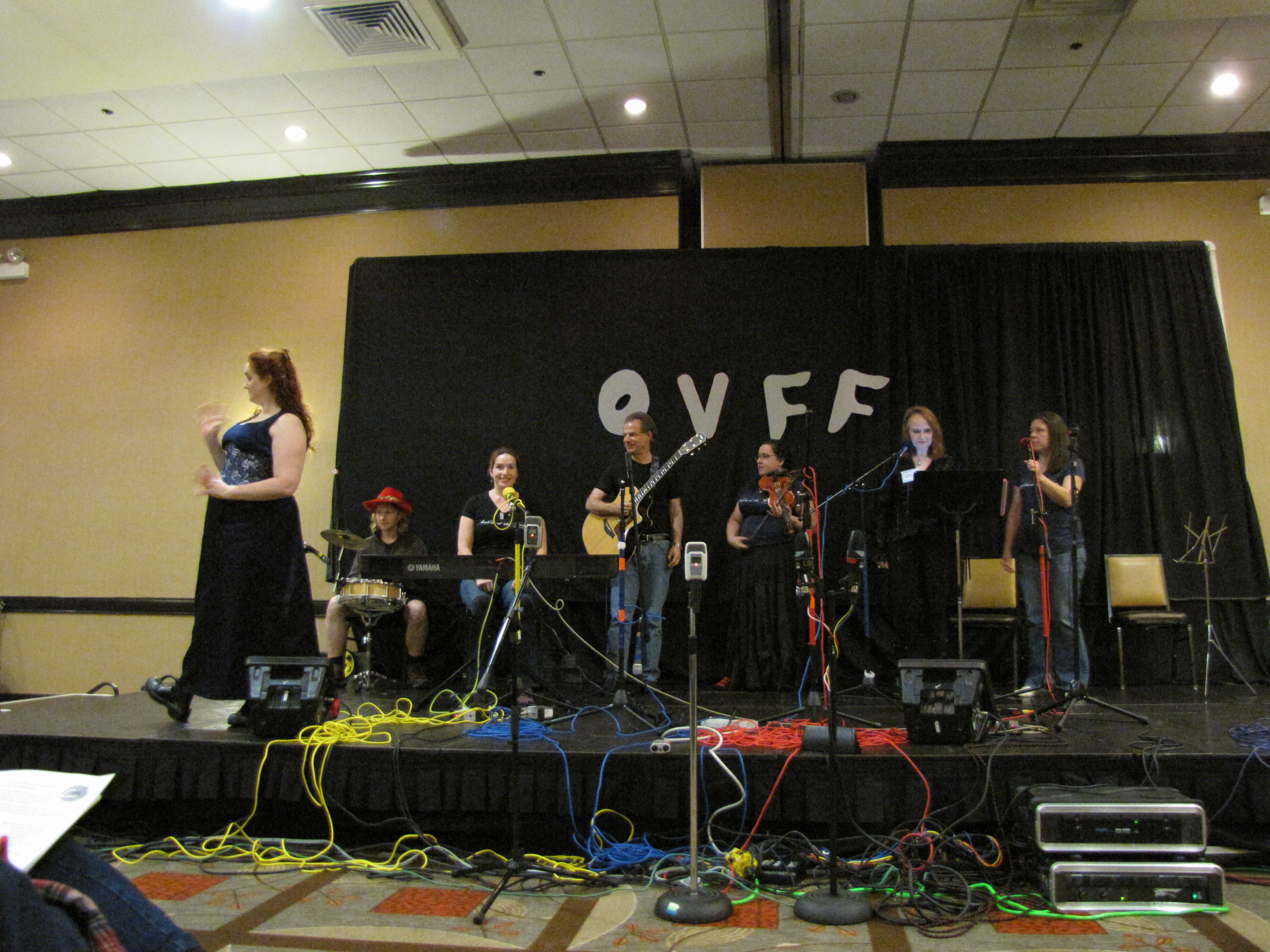
Mary Crowell and others on stage at Ohio Valley Filk Fest 2012

The Pegasus Award is the premier award for filk music and is annually hosted at the Ohio Valley Filk Fest (OVFF).

== Awards ==
The Pegasus Awards were founded to recognize and honor excellence in filking. As science fiction (sci-fi) became better known and widespread within society in the 20th century as a distinct literary genre, many fans expressed themselves through works of music and art, including filking. The Pegasus Awards formally recognise filking or fan music as a fine lens that the sci-fi community shares with particular fiction-based cultural ideas.

Anyone with an interest in filk can nominate songs or individuals for the awards, and anyone can vote. It is not necessary to be a member of the convention to be involved in the nomination and voting process.

Currently awards are given in six categories: Best Song, Best Performer, Best Writer/Composer, Best Classic Song and two topical categories that vary from year to year. Some examples of past categories include: Best Love Song, Best Literature Song, Best Techie Song, Best Sing Along, etc.

The OVFF convention committee solicits nominations for finalists for the Pegasus Awards (the Nominating Ballot) during the late spring and summer. There is an opinion poll that runs during the year as well to help interested folk brainstorm ideas for the nominating ballot. The finalist ballot is distributed in the early fall, and must be returned by the opening night of OVFF. Voting can be done online—either to nominate finalists, or to vote for the finalists themselves. The final round of voting happens at OVFF itself, where handwritten ballots are collected after the annual Pegasus concert. The entire process is administered by the OVFF convention committee.

== Ohio Valley Filk Fest ==
Ohio Valley Filk Fest
- Status: Active
- Genre: Filk music
- Location: Worthington, Ohio
- Country: United States
- Inaugurated: 1984
- Website: http://www.ovff.org/

The Ohio Valley Filk Fest, (OVFF) is one of the largest filk music conventions. It is held annually in October in the Columbus, Ohio area, and the culmination of the event is the presentation of the Pegasus Award.

The first OVFF was held in 1984 in Cincinnati and was attended by about 80 people; it included the presentation of the first Pegasus Awards. After skipping 1985, it moved to the Columbus area but retained "Ohio Valley" in its name. The convention has been held every year since then, in various locations in Columbus. Recent conventions had been held in Dublin, Ohio, then as of 2010 the convention Worthington, until moving back to Columbus in 2025.

== Lists of award winners ==
* Ties and joint winners

=== Best Performer ===
Year	Performer	Notes
2026	Sunnie Larsen	
2025	The Blibbering Humdingers	Duo
2024	Dave Clement	
2023	Summer Russell	
2022	Jen Midkiff	
2021	The Faithful Sidekicks	Band
2021	Rhiannon's Lark	
2020	Margaret Davis and Kristoph Klover	Duo
2019	Playing Rapunzel	Duo
2018	Random Fractions	Band
2018	Twotonic	Duo
2017	Judi Miller	
2016	Play It With Moxie	Band
2015	Jeff & Maya Bohnhoff	
2014	Cheshire Moon	Band
2013	Alexander James Adams	
2012	Betsy Tinney	
2012	Wild Mercy	Band
2011	Amy McNally	
2010	S. J. Tucker	
2009	Heather Dale & Ben Deschamps	
2008	Vixy & Tony	Band
2007	Dr. Mary Crowell	
2007	Seanan McGuire	
2006	Judi Miller	
2005	Jeff & Maya Bohnhoff	
2004	Urban Tapestry	Band
2003	Dandelion Wine	Band
2002	Three Weird Sisters	Band
2001	Talis Kimberley	
2000	Ookla the Mok	Band
1999	Decadent Dave Clement	
1998	Steve Macdonald	
1997	Urban Tapestry	Band
1996	Heather Alexander	
1995	Michael Longcor (Moonwulf)	
1994	The Black Book Band	Band
1993	Tom Smith	
1992	Michael Longcor (Moonwulf)	
1991	Tom Smith	
1990	Mitchell Clapp	
1989	Technical Difficulties	Band
1988	Barry & Sally Childs-Helton	
1987	Julia Ecklar	
1986	Leslie Fish	As "Best Female Filker"
1986	Bill Sutton	As "Best Male Filker"
1984	Julia Ecklar	As "Best Female Filker"
1984	Bill Maraschiello	As "Best Male Filker"

=== Best Writer/Composer ===
Year	Writer/Composer
2025	Bill Roper
2025	Eric Distad
2024	Cathy McManamon
2023	Lauren Oxford
2022	Cecilia Eng
2021	Lawrence Dean
2020	Andrew Ross
2019	Eva Van Daele-Hunt
2018	Leslie Hudson
2017	Ju Honisch
2017	Jordin Kare
2016	Barry Childs-Helton
2015	Cat Faber
2014	Tim Griffin
2013	Talis Kimberley
2012	Juanita Coulson
2012	Dr. Mary Crowell
2011	S. J. Tucker
2010	Heather Dale
2009	Vixy & Tony
2008	Seanan McGuire
2007	Talis Kimberley
2006	Cynthia McQuillin
2005	Tom Smith
2004	Kathy Mar
2003	Cat Faber
2002	Zander Nyrond
2001	Talis Kimberley
2000	Bob Kanefsky
1999	Cynthia McQuillin
1998	Cat Faber
1997	Rand Bellavia & Adam English
1996	Heather Alexander
1995	Steve Macdonald
1994	Tom Smith
1993	Leslie Fish
1992	Dr. Jane Robinson
1991	Tom Smith
1990	Julia Ecklar
1989	Mercedes Lackey
1988	Mercedes Lackey
1987	Leslie Fish

=== Song awards ===
==== Best Filk Song ====
Year	Song	Creator(s)
2026	The Tiniest Bit of Powder	Dr. Mary Crowell
2025	One Small Boat	Marilisa Valtazanou
2024	I am I	Eva Van Daele-Hunt
2023	Following Our Dreams	Lawrence Dean
2022	The Entwife	Summer Russell
2021	Second-Hand Heaven	Lawrence Dean
2020	Child of the Library	Piers & Gill Cawley
2020	Mordred's Lullaby	Heather Dale
2019	Lucy on the Line	Tim Griffin
2018	Pageant Legend	Katy Dröge-Macdonald & Ju Honisch
2017	We Are Who We Are	Michelle Dockrey & Tony Fabris
2016	Creatures of Dream	Batya Wittenberg
2015	My Story Is Not Done	Seanan McGuire
2014	Paper Worlds	Talis Kimberley
2014	Snow White, Red Road	Cheshire Moon
2013	Joan	Heather Dale & Ben Deschamps
2012	Cheshire Kitten	S. J. Tucker
2011	Wicked Girls	Seanan McGuire
2010	A Thousand Ships	Ju Honisch & Katy Dröge-Macdonald
2009	The Wreck of the Crash of the Easthill Mining Disaster	Brooke Lunderville
2008	Uplift	Andrew Eigel
2007	Rich Fantasy Lives	Rob Balder & Tom Smith
2006	The Girl That's Never Been	Michelle Dockrey
2005	Rocket Ride	Tom Smith
2004	The Lady	Jodi Krangle
2003	Shooting Star	Michael Longcor (Moonwulf)
2002	Velvet	Talis Kimberley
2001	Strangers No More	Brenda Sutton
2000	Sam's Song	Zander Nyrond & Soren Nyrond
1999	The Word of God	Cat Faber
1998	When I Was A Boy	Frank Hayes
1997	Road to Roswell	Karen Linsley & Lloyd Landa
1996	When Giants Walked	Kathy Mar
1995	Journey's Done	Steve Macdonald
1994	Drink Up The River	Kathy Mar
1994	PQR (You Ain't Seen Nothing Yet)	Tom Smith
1993	The Green Hills of Earth	Robert Heinlein & Mark Bernstein
1992	God Lives on Terra	Julia Ecklar
1991	A Boy and His Frog	Tom Smith
1990	Lullabye For a Weary World	T. J. Burnside Clapp
1989	Dawson's Christian	Duane Elms
1989	Arafel's Song	Kathy Mar (music) & Mercedes Lackey (lyrics)
1988	Wind From Rainbow's End	Bill Roper
1987	Harbors	Anne Passovoy
1986	Witnesses' Waltz	Leslie Fish
1984	Hope Eyrie	Leslie Fish

==== Best Classic Filk Song ====
Year	Song	Creator(s)
2025	Before the Dawn	Mike Whitaker
2025	Merry Meet	Steve Macdonald
2024	Flowers for Algernon	Kathy Mar
2023	Die Puppen (The Dolls)	Eva Van Daele-Hunt
2022	Helva's Song	Cecilia Eng
2021	Nessie, Come Up	Dr. Jane Robinson
2020	Somebody Will	Ada Palmer
2019	Ship of Stone	Don Simpson
2018	Creature of the Wood	Heather Alexander & Philip Obermarck
2017	Alligator in the House	Betsy Tinney, Cade Tinney & S. J. Tucker
2016	Take It Back	Kathleen Sloan
2015	Captain Jack & the Mermaid	Meg Davis
2014	Grandfather	Gary Hanak
2013	Second-Hand Songs	Jonathan Turner
2012	Tiberius Rising	Rand Bellavia & Adam English
2011	The Phoenix	Julia Ecklar
2010	Fire In The Sky	Jordin Kare
2009	Still Catch the Tide	Talis Kimberley
2008	Archetype Cafe	Talis Kimberley
2007	Falling Down on New Jersey	Mitchell Burnside Clapp
2006	I Want To Be Peter Lorre	Tom Smith
2005	Never Set the Cat On Fire	Frank Hayes
2004	Ladyhawke!	Julia Ecklar
2003	Banned From Argo	Leslie Fish

==== Topical categories ====
Year	Category	Song	Creator(s)
2026	Best End of the World Song	Earth That Was	Cecilia Eng
2026	Best Humorous Song	Apology	Bill and Gretchen Roper
2025	Best Hero Song	The Ones Who Walked Away	Beth Kinderman
2025	Best Villain Song	The Evil Eyeball	Sibylle Machat
2024	Best Magic Song	Water	Cathy McManamon
2024	Best Risque Song	Passion Flower	Cecilia Eng
2023	Best Adapted Song	Come to Mordor	Jeff Bonhoff
2023	Best Adapted Song	Meat	Kathleen Sloan
2023	Best Science Song	Poisoned Apples	Don Neill
2023	Best Science Song	Shoulders of Giants	Tim Griffin
2022	Best Furry Friend Song	Underfoot	Jen Midkiff
2022	Best Song that Tells a Story	Nine hundred and ninety-nine	Mich Sampson & Marilisa Valtazanou
2021	Best Mad Science Song	I Built a Time Machine	Eric Distad
2021	Best Cheery-Ose Song	Tiny Kraken	Rhiannon's Lark
2020	Best Media Song	Goodnight, Sarah Jane	Talis Kimberley
2020	Best Space Song	Following in Valentina's Footsteps	Valerie Housden
2019	Best Family Song	Golden Rule	Sabine Kinder
2019	Best Sing-Along Song	Gone Filkin'	Tom Jeffers
2018	Best Song About Community	Many Hearts, One Voice	Steve Macdonald
2018	Best Roadtrip Song	Oregon Trail	Tim Griffin
2018	Best Roadtrip Song	Road to Santiago	Heather Dale
2017	Best Horror Song	Dear Gina	Seanan McGuire
2017	Best Perky Song	Chocolate Is A Vegetable	Graham Leathers
2016	Best Adapted Song	Six Transit Genitalia Centauri	Bob Kanefsky
2016	Best Exploration Song	Starsoul	Roger Burton West & Jodi Krangle
2015	Best Adapted Song	Grabthar's Silver Hammer	Steve Macdonald
2015	Best Time-Related Song	Precious Moments	Phil Allcock
2014	Best Adapted Song	Midichlorian Rhapsody	Jeff Bohnhoff
2014	Best Song of Passage	Outward Bound	Cat Faber
2013	Best Alien Song	Little Fuzzy Animals	Frank Hayes
2013	Best Fairytale Song	Dryad's Promise	Betsy Tinney
2012	Best Gaming Song	I Put My Low Stat	Dr. Mary Crowell
2012	Best Travel Song	No Hurry	Michelle Dockrey
2011	Best Badass Song	Evil Laugh	Seanan McGuire
2011	Best Romantic Song	As I Am	Heather Dale
2010	Best Mad Science Song	What A Woman's For	Seanan McGuire
2010	Best Magic Song	Where The Magic Is Real	Paul Kwinn
2009	A Little Bit Country	Stray Dog Man	Bill Sutton
2009	A Little Bit Rock and Roll	Six-String Love	Vixy & Tony
2008	Best Comedy Song	Close Your Eyes	Daniel Glasser
2008	Best Tragedy Song	Black Davie's Ride	Cynthia McQuillin
2007	Best Dorsai Song	Shai!	Steve Simmons & Steve Macdonald
2007	Best Song of Home	Emerald Green	Michelle Dockrey & Tony Fabris
2006	Best Battle Song	March of Cambreadth	Heather Alexander
2006	Best Torch Song	X-Libris	Talis Kimberley
2005	Best Space Opera Song	Signy Mallory	Mercedes Lackey & Leslie Fish
2005	Best Sword & Sorcery Song	Threes	Mercedes Lackey & Leslie Fish
2004	Best Comic Book Song	Arthur Curry	Rand Bellavia & Adam English
2004	Best Tribute	A Simple Country Doctor	Matt Leger
2003	Best Original Humorous Song	My Husband the Filker	Bill Roper & Gretchen Roper
2003	Best Parody	Knight's In White Satin	Jeff & Maya Bohnhoff
2002	Best Chilling/Spine-Tingling Song	In A Gown Too Blue	Brenda Sutton
2002	Best Song That Tells A Story	Horsetamers Daughter	Leslie Fish
2001	Best Computer Song	Tech Support	Jeff Hitchin
2001	Best Creature Song	Least of My Kind	Cat Faber
2000	Best End of the World Song	Out Of A Clear Blue Sky	Dr. Jane Robinson
2000	Best Food/Drink Song	307 Ale	Tom Smith
2000	Best Food/Drink Song	My Jalapeño Man	Debbie Ridpath Ohi
1999	Best Fool Song	Operation Desert Storm	Tom Smith
1999	Best Hero Song	A Toast for Unknown Heroes	Leslie Fish
1998	Best Adaptation	Mary O'Meara	Poul Anderson & Anne Passovoy
1998	Best Myth Song	Cold Butcher	Steve Macdonald
1997	Best Science Song	World Inside the Crystal	Steve Savitzky
1997	Best Sorcery Song	The Dark Is Rising	Susan Cooper & Julia Ecklar
1996	Best Eerie Song	Bloodchild	Joey Shoji
1996	Best EerieSong	Monster In My Head	Michael Longcor (Moonwulf)
1996	Best Spiritual Song	Circles	Gwen Zack
1995	Best MilitarySong	When Tenskwatawa Sings	Michael Longcor (Moonwulf)
1995	Best Sing-A-Long/Choral Song	Acts of Creation	Cat Faber
1994	Best Children's Song	Monsters in the Night	Diana Gallagher
1994	Best Risque Song	Like A Lamb to the Slaughter	Frank Hayes
1993	Best Humorous Song	Rhinotillexomania	Michael Longcor (Moonwulf)
1993	Best Space Song	Lightsailor	Barry Childs-Helton
1992	Best Genre Crossover	Return of the King	Tom Smith
1992	Best Tribute	Madame Curie's Hands	Duane Elms
1991	Best Love Song	Velveteen	Kathy Mar
1991	Best War/Vengeance Song	Temper of Revenge	Julia Ecklar
1990	Best Fannish Song	Weekend Only World	T. J. Burnside Clapp
1990	Best Literature Song	Daddy's Little Girl	Julia Ecklar
1989	Best Fantasy Song	Wind's Four Quarters	Mercedes Lackey & Leslie Fish
1989	Best Techie Song	Do It Yourself	Bill Sutton
1988	Best Historical Song	Song of the Shieldwall	Debra Doyle (as Malkin Grey) & Melissa Williamson (as Peregryn Wyndryder)
1988	Best Media Song	Superman's Sex Life Boogie	Tom Smith
1987	Best 'Ose	Ian the Grim	Clif Flynt
1987	Best Schtick	Unreality Warp/Kinda Mediocre, Actually	Clif Flynt & Bill Roper
1986	Best Original HumorousSong	A Reconsideration of Anatomical Docking Maneuvers in a Zero-G Environment	Diana Gallagher
1986	Best Parody	Daddy's Little Boy	Murray Porath
1984	Best Original Humorous Filk Song	Unreality Warp	Clif Flynt
1984	Best Parody	Twelve Years at Worldcon	Frank Hayes
