= Barry and Sally Childs-Helton =

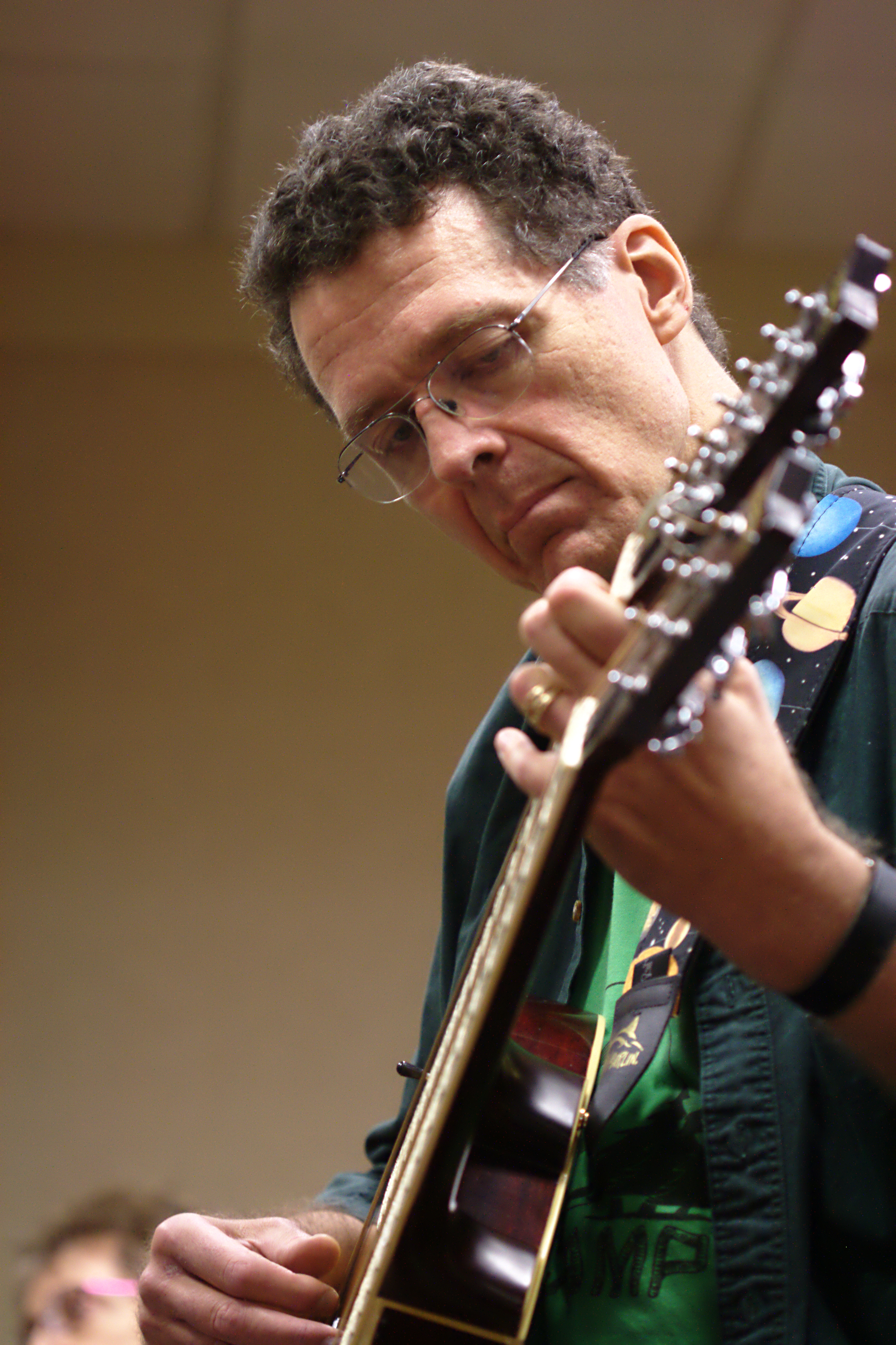
Barry Childs-Helton at Ohio Valley Filk Fest 2009

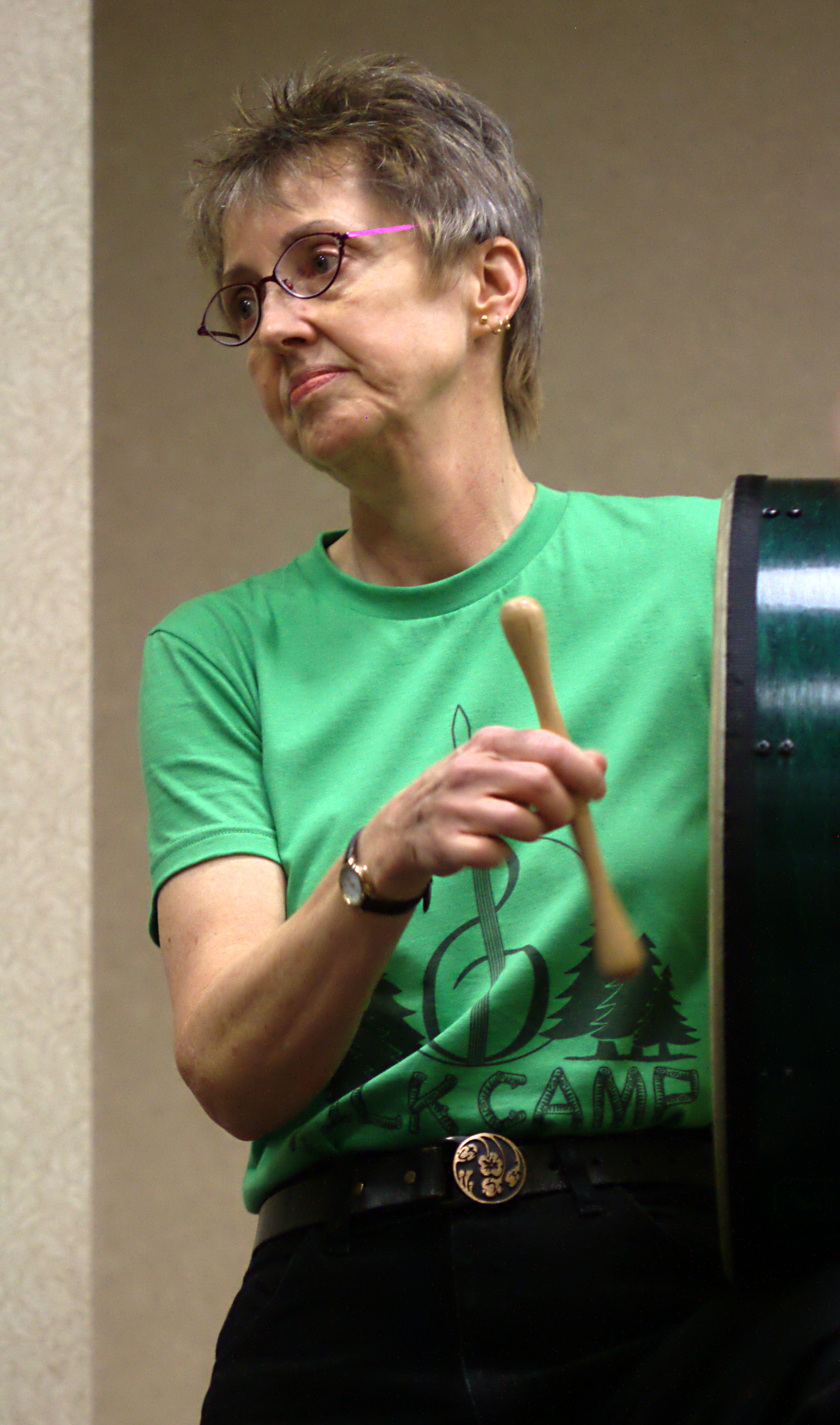
Sally Childs-Helton at Ohio Valley Filk Fest 2009

Barry and Sally Childs-Helton are a husband-and-wife duo of filk performers based in Indianapolis, Indiana. Barry is a guitarist and songwriter, while Sally is a percussionist (and Music for People improvisation teacher). Their repertoire ranges from parodies to lyrically dense "space music," incorporating diverse musical genres including folk, blues, rock, and jazz. Both have doctorate degrees in folklore from Indiana University, and the title of their album Paradox is an intentional pun. (Sally's song Alphabet Soup can be read as her commentary on academia.) They are legacy members of The Black Book Band (active 1990–1998) and current members of Wild Mercy (2002–present). Together they have been nominated 21 times for the Pegasus Award given by the Ohio Valley Filk Fest, collecting 5 trophies. In 2003, they were inducted into the Filk Hall of Fame.

== Discography ==
- Escape from Mundania 1987, Space Opera House - cassette
- Paradox 1989, Space Opera House - cassette
- First Contact 1995, Dodeka Records (with Black Book Band) - cassette
- First Contact 1997, Dodeka Records (with Black Book Band) - CD with bonus tracks
- Tempus Fugitives 2001, Dodeka Records - CD compilation of selected tracks from Escape from Mundania and Paradox
- Summer Storm 2003, Small Green Alien Productions (with Wild Mercy) - CD
- Furious Fancies 2005, Small Green Alien Productions (with Wild Mercy) - CD
- Dream of a Far Light 2008, Small Green Alien Productions (with WIld Mercy) - CD
- The Summers Behind You 2015, Dragon Scale Studios (Barry solo) - CD

== Pegasus Awards ==
- 1988 Best Performer
- 1993 (Barry) Best Space Song (Lightsailor)
- 1994 (w/ Black Book Band) Best Performer
- 2012 (w/ Wild Mercy) Best Performer
- 2016 (Barry) Best Writer/Composer

== Pegasus Nominations (individually and jointly) ==
- Best Writer/Composer - 1988, 1990, 1991, 1993, 2008, 2010, 2011, 2015
- Best Performer - 1991, 1993, 2008, 2009
- Best Genre Crossover - 1992, 1993
- Best Fannish Song - 1990
- Best Love Song - 1991
- Best End of the World Song - 2000
- Best Risque Song - 1994
- Best Filk Song - 2010
- Best Classic Filk Song - 2016, 2017
