= Steve Macdonald (filk musician) =

American filk singer/songwriter

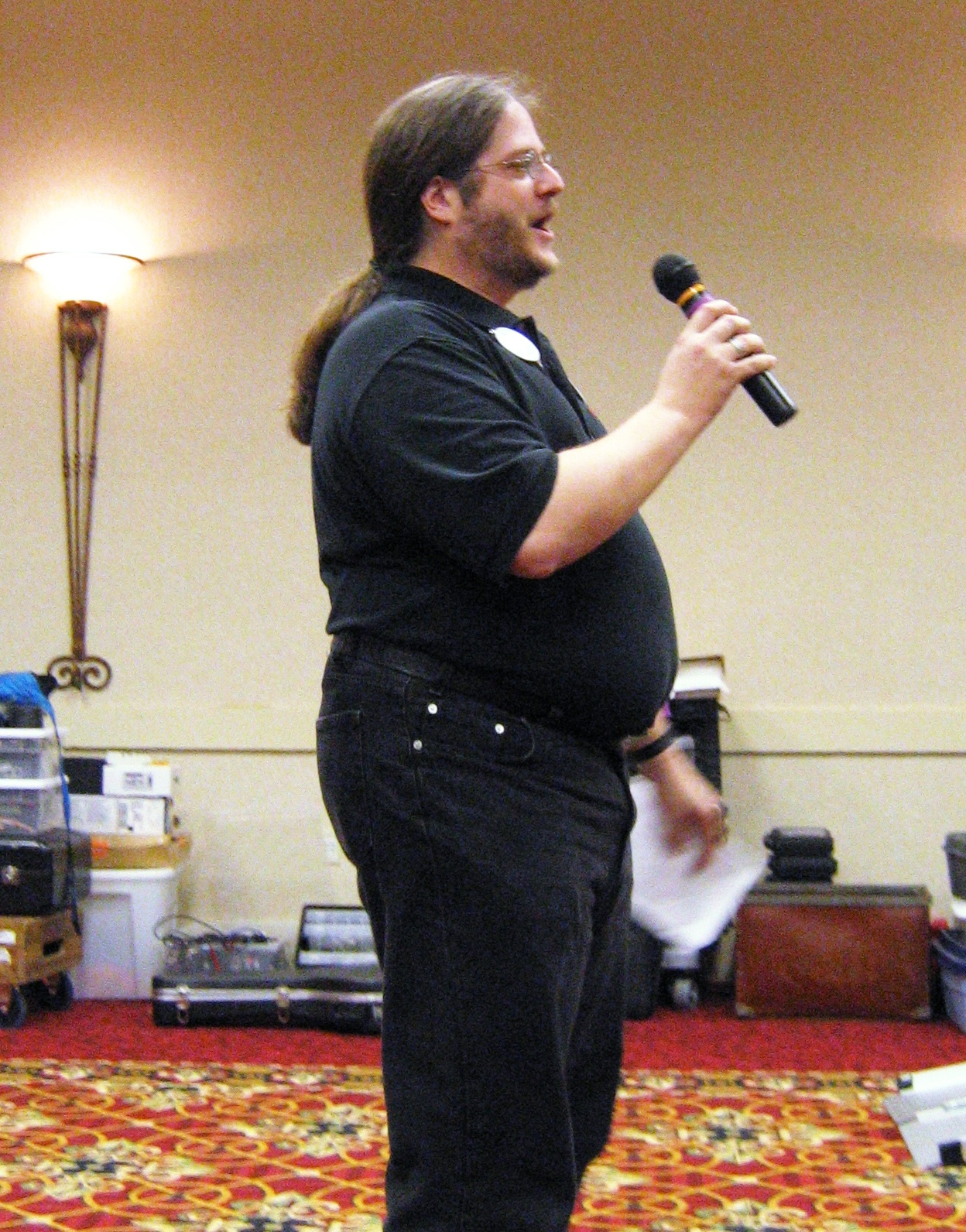
- Steve Macdonald at Ohio Valley Filk Festival 2005

Background information
- Born: Michigan, United States
- Genres: Filk
- Website: www.stevemacdonald.org

Steve Macdonald is an American filk singer/songwriter, who also appears at Renaissance Faires as "Gallamor the Bard". He served for several years as the Pegasus Award Evangelista, and was responsible for many changes in the award process that led to much greater participation among the voting base. He was inducted into the Filk Hall of Fame in 2006.

In September 2006 he emigrated to Germany.

== WorlDream ==
WorlDream was a project that organized hundreds of filkers in North America and Europe to sing one song together, in celebration of the new millennium. Steve Macdonald, the project's instigator, attended ten conventions during 2001, and recorded filkers singing "Many Hearts, One Voice", a song he composed for the project. The tracks were then merged electronically. A number of one-off CDs of raw mixes were sold as Interfilk auction items, but due to lost tapes and technical difficulties, public release only happened in January 2021, celebrating the 20th anniversary of the project.

Singers were taped at all nine filk conventions held in 2001, in the United States, in Canada, the United Kingdom, and Germany, as well as the 2001 World Science Fiction Convention in Philadelphia. Altogether 436 singers were recorded, many at more than one convention.

== Discography ==
- Songspinner, 1994, Dodeka Records
- Journey's Done, 1995, Dodeka Records
- Reap The Wind, 1999, Dodeka Records
- Crossroads, 2002, Dodeka Records
- Gather Day, 2004, Thin Ice Studios
- Drive By Barding, 2006, Thin Ice Studios
- Rowan & Storm (as part of the duo "Twotonic"), 2014, Mystic Fig Studio

== Pegasus Awards ==
- Best Filk Song 1995, Journey's Done
- Best Writer/Composer 1995
- Best Myth Song 1998, Cold Butcher
- Best Performer 1998
- Best Dorsai Song 2007, Shai! (with Steve Simmons)
- Best Adapted Song 2015, Grabthar's Silver Hammer
- Best Song About Community 2018, Many Hearts, One Voice
- Best Performer 2018 – as part of the duo Twotonic
- Best Classic Filk Song 2025, Merry Meet
