= Urban Tapestry =

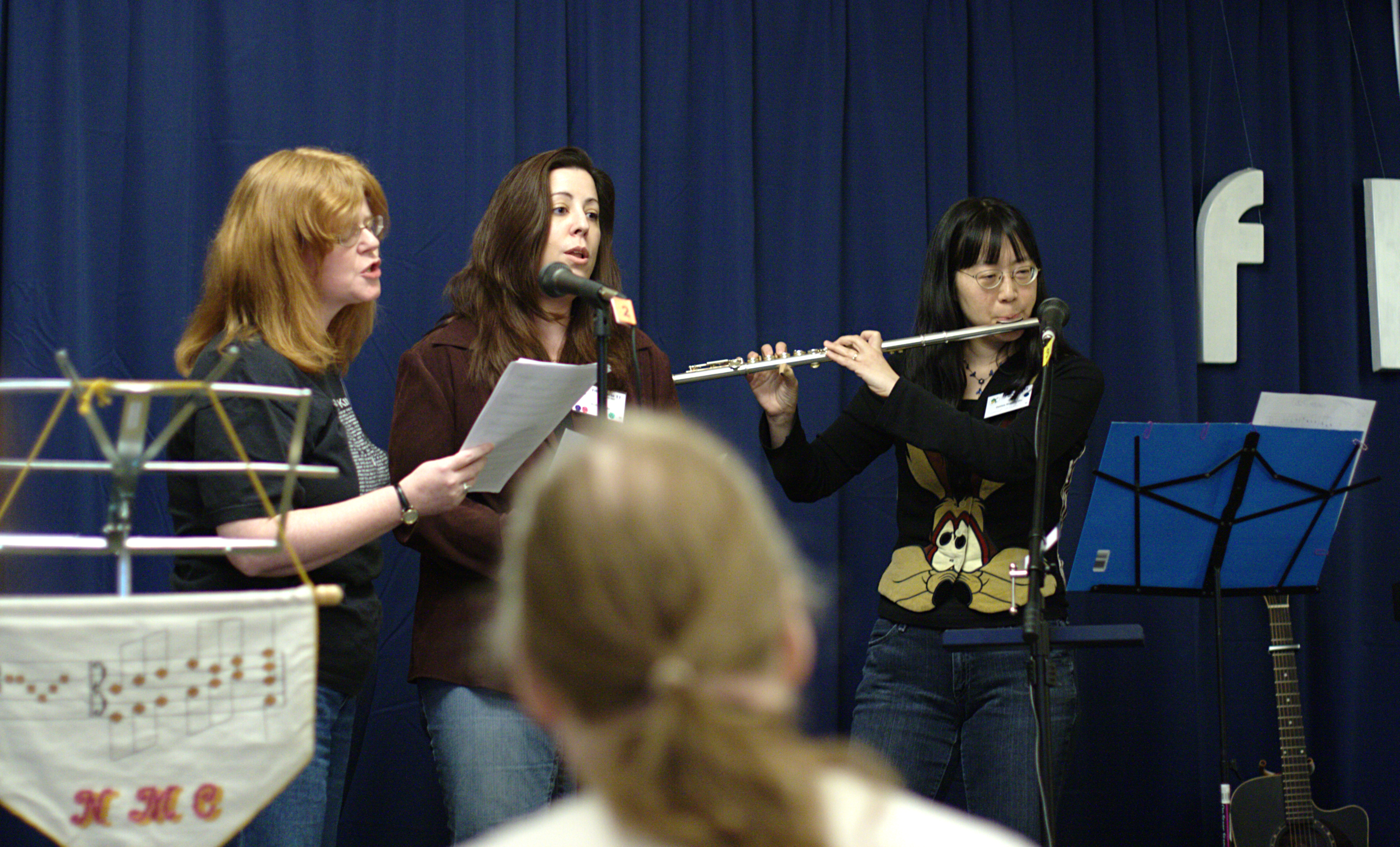
- Urban Tapestry at FilKONtario 2007

Background information
- Genres: Filk
- Members: Debbie Ridpath Ohi; Allison Durno; Jodi Krangle
- Website: http://www.urbantapestry.org/

Urban Tapestry is a three-woman band based in Toronto, Ontario that performs filk music, composed by Debbie Ridpath Ohi, Allison Durno, and Jodi Krangle. As a group, they won the 'Best Performer' Pegasus Award in both 1997 and 2004.

Urban Tapestry has released three albums between 1994 and 2003.

== Discography ==
- Castles and Skyscrapers, 1994. Cover art by Ruth Ohi
- Myths and Urban Legends, Dodeka Records, 1997. Cover art by Beckett Gladney
- Sushi and High Tea, Dodeka Records, 2003. Cover art by Beckett Gladney
