= 58th World Science Fiction Convention =

58th Worldcon (2000)

Chicon 2000, the 58th World Science Fiction Convention
- Genre: Science fiction
- Dates: 31 August–4 September 2000
- Venue: Hyatt Regency Chicago
- Location: Chicago, Illinois
- Country: United States
- Attendance: 5,794
- Organizer: Chicago in 2000
- Filing status: 501(c)(3) non-profit
- Website: 2000.chicon.org

The 58th World Science Fiction Convention (Worldcon), also known as Chicon 2000, was held on 31 August–4 September 2000 at the Hyatt Regency Chicago, Sofitel Hotel and Fairmont Hotel in Chicago, Illinois, United States.

The organizing committee was chaired by Tom Veal.

== Participants ==
Attendance was 5,794, out of 6,574 paid memberships.

=== Guests of honor ===
- Ben Bova (author)
- Bob Eggleton (artist)
- Jim Baen (editor)
- Bob Passovoy & Anne Passovoy (fan)
- Harry Turtledove (toastmaster)

=== Other program participants ===
In addition to the guests of honor, Chicon 2000 had 613 program participants taking part in over 1,000 programming items. Some of the notable science fiction writers participating to the convention included:

- Kevin J. Anderson
- Catherine Asaro
- David Brin
- Jack L. Chalker
- John Clute
- Esther M. Friesner
- Richard Garfinkle
- Elizabeth Hand
- Harry Harrison
- Paul Levinson
- George R. R. Martin
- Jack McDevitt
- Larry Niven
- Frederik Pohl
- Terry Pratchett
- Mike Resnick
- Robert Silverberg
- Michael Swanwick
- Connie Willis
- Gene Wolfe

=== Future site selection ===
The 61st World Science Fiction Convention to be held in 2003 was awarded to Toronto, Ontario, Canada.

== Awards ==
The World Science Fiction Society administers and presents the Hugo Awards, the oldest and most noteworthy award for science fiction. Selection of the recipients is by vote of the Worldcon members. Categories include novels and short fiction, artwork, dramatic presentations, and various professional and fandom activities.

Other awards may be presented at Worldcon at the discretion of the individual convention committee. This has often included the national SF awards of the host country, such as the Japanese Seiun Awards as part of Nippon 2007, and the Prix Aurora Awards as part of Anticipation in 2009. The Astounding Award for Best New Writer and the Sidewise Award, though not sponsored by the Worldcon, are usually presented, as well as the Chesley Awards, the Prometheus Award, and others. In 2021, the Nommo Awards began presenting at Worldcon.

=== 2000 Hugo Awards ===
The awards were administered by Michael Nelson, Covert Beach, Robert MacIntosh, Tom Veal, Mike Jencevice, and Becky Thomson. The base was designed by Johnna Klukas.

- Best Novel: A Deepness in the Sky by Vernor Vinge
- Best Novella: "The Winds of Marble Arch" by Connie Willis
- Best Novelette: "10^{16} to 1" by James Patrick Kelly
- Best Short Story: "Scherzo with Tyrannosaur" by Michael Swanwick
- Best Related Book: Science Fiction of the 20th Century: An Illustrated History by Frank M. Robinson
- Best Dramatic Presentation: Galaxy Quest
- Best Professional Editor: Gardner Dozois
- Best Professional Artist: Michael Whelan
- Best Semiprozine: Locus, edited by Charles N. Brown
- Best Fanzine: File 770, edited by Mike Glyer
- Best Fan Writer: Dave Langford
- Best Fan Artist: Joe Mayhew (posthumous)

=== Other awards ===
- John W. Campbell Award for Best New Writer: Cory Doctorow

== The bid ==
During the bidding process, Chicago in 2000 issued approximately forty trading cards depicting a variety of science fiction authors and artists, including Gordon R. Dickson, Terry Pratchett, and Larry Niven. Anyone who collected twenty of the cards and voted in site selection received a free membership conversion to Chicon 2000. When Chicago in 2000 won, they issued a trading card #0 that announced their guests of honor.

== See also ==
- Hugo Award
- Science fiction
- Speculative fiction
- World Science Fiction Society
- Worldcon

Preceded by 57th World Science Fiction Convention; Aussiecon III in Melbourne, Australia (1999)	List of Worldcons; 58th World Science Fiction Convention; Chicon 2000 in Chicago, Illinois, United States (2000)	Succeeded by 59th World Science Fiction Convention; Millennium Philcon in Philadelphia, Pennsylvania, United States (2001)
