= Technical Difficulties (filk group) =

American filk group

Technical Difficulties was a Filk group composed of Sheila Willis, Linda Melnick and T.J. Burnside (now T.J. Burnside Clapp). They won The Pegasus Award ("For Excellence In Filking") in the Best Performer category at the Ohio Valley Filk Fest convention in 1989, and produced two albums on cassette, Please Stand By and Station Break.

== Albums ==
=== Please Stand By ===
==== Side 1 ====
- Lullaby for a Weary World
- Reluctant Freedom
- Elizabeth's Song
- Come You Knights
- Innocence Lost
- Dedication

==== Side 2 ====
- Technical Difficulties, Part I: Dona Nobis Pacem
- One Final Lesson
- Break Forth
- Few Days
- Thinking of You / The Cruel War
- Technical Difficulties, Part II: The Hallelujah Chorus

=== Station Break ===
==== Side 1 ====
- Star Sisters
- Ladyhawke!
- Go, Traveller
- Dairy Queen
- Robin Hood
- Arafel's Song

==== Side 1 ====
- Wolf and Hawk
- Challenge
- Wishful Thinking
- Jaq's Song
- Dreamer's Lament
- Technical Difficulties, Part III: Pachalbel's Canon in G
