= Poul Anderson =

American science fiction writer (1926–2001)

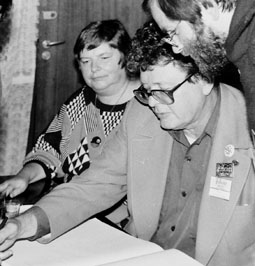
- Anderson (center, beside his wife) at Polcon in 1985
- Born: Poul William Anderson; November 25, 1926; Bristol, Pennsylvania, U.S.
- Died: July 31, 2001 (aged 74); Orinda, California, U.S.
- Occupation: Writer
- Writing career
- Pen name: A. A. Craig; Michael Karageorge; Winston P. Sanders; P. A. Kingsley
- Period: 1948–2001
- Genres: Science fiction Fantasy; Mystery; Historical fiction
- Notable works: The Broken Sword; Tau Zero; Three Hearts and Three Lions

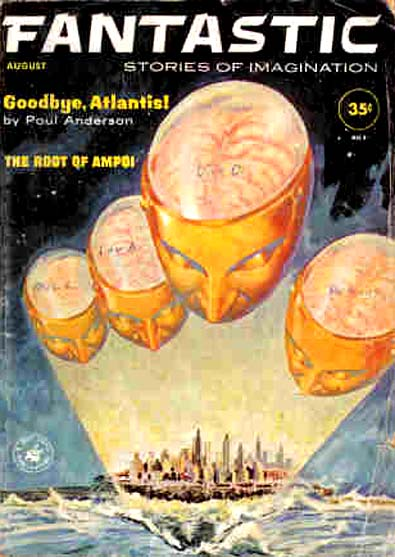
An early cover story in August 1961

Poul William Anderson (/ˈpoʊəl/ POH-əl; November 25, 1926 – July 31, 2001) was an American fantasy and science fiction author who was active from the 1940s until his death in 2001. Anderson also wrote historical novels. He won the Hugo Award seven times and the Nebula Award three times, and was nominated many more times for awards.

== Biography ==
Poul Anderson was born on November 25, 1926, in Bristol, Pennsylvania to Danish parents. Soon after his birth, his father, Anton Anderson, relocated the family to Texas, where they lived for more than ten years. After Anton Anderson's death, his widow took the children to Denmark. The family returned to the United States after the beginning of World War II, settling eventually on a Minnesota farm.

While he was an undergraduate student at the University of Minnesota, Anderson's first stories were published by editor John W. Campbell in the magazine Astounding Science Fiction: "Tomorrow's Children" by Anderson and F. N. Waldrop in March 1947 and a sequel, "Chain of Logic" by Anderson alone, in July. (Note: Anderson continued his first two stories more than a decade later. He added a novella and an epilogue, constituting the collection of four pieces (termed a novel), Twilight World: A Science Fiction Novel of Tomorrow's Children (Dodd, Mead). Waldrop was not credited.) He earned his BA in physics with honors but became a freelance writer after he graduated in 1948. His third story was printed in the December Astounding.

Anderson married Karen Kruse in 1953 and relocated with her to the San Francisco Bay area. Their daughter Astrid (later married to science fiction author Greg Bear) was born in 1954. They made their home in Orinda, California. Over the years Poul gave many readings at The Other Change of Hobbit bookstore in Berkeley; his widow later donated his typewriter and desk to the store.

In 1954, he published the fantasy novel The Broken Sword, one of his best-known works.

In 1965, Algis Budrys said that Anderson "has for some time been science fiction's best storyteller". He was a founding member of the Society for Creative Anachronism (SCA) in 1966 and of the Swordsmen and Sorcerers' Guild of America (SAGA), also during the mid-1960s. The latter was a group of heroic fantasy authors organized by Lin Carter, originally eight in number, with entry by credentials as a fantasy writer alone. Anderson was the sixth President of the Science Fiction and Fantasy Writers of America, taking office in 1972.

Robert A. Heinlein dedicated his 1985 novel The Cat Who Walks Through Walls to Anderson and eight of the other members of the Citizens' Advisory Council on National Space Policy.

The Science Fiction Writers of America made Anderson its 16th SFWA Grand Master in 1998. In 2000's fifth class, he was inducted into the Science Fiction and Fantasy Hall of Fame as one of two deceased and two living writers.

He died of prostate cancer on July 31, 2001, after a month in the hospital. A few of his novels were first published posthumously.

== Awards, honors and nominations ==
- Gandalf Grand Master of Fantasy (1978)
- Hugo Award (seven wins)
- John W. Campbell Memorial Award (2000)
- Inkpot Award (1986)
- Locus Award (41 nominations; one win, 1972)
- Mythopoeic Fantasy Award (one win (1975))
- Nebula Award (three wins)
- Pegasus Award (best adaptation, with Anne Passovoy) (1998)
- Prometheus Award (Best Novel in 1996, as well as five Hall of Fame award and a Special Prometheus Award for Lifetime Achievement in 2001)
- SFWA Grand Master (1997)
- Science Fiction and Fantasy Hall of Fame (2000)
- Asteroid 7758 Poulanderson, discovered by Eleanor Helin at Palomar in 1990, was named in his honor. The official naming citation was published by the Minor Planet Center on September 2, 2001, a month after his death (M.P.C. 43381).
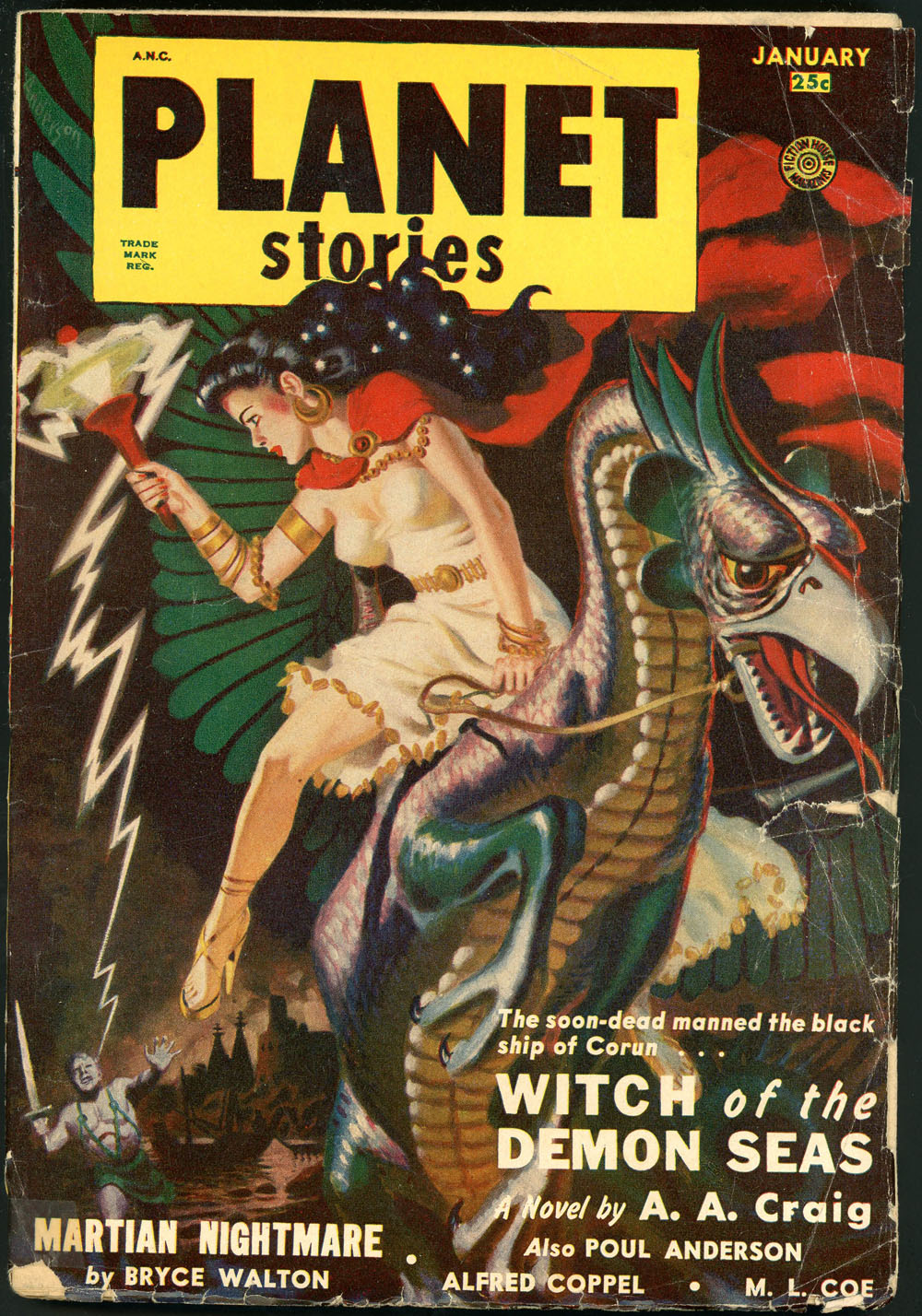
Anderson's novella Witch of the Demon Seas (published under his "A. A. Craig" byline) was the cover story in the January 1951 issue of Planet Stories.

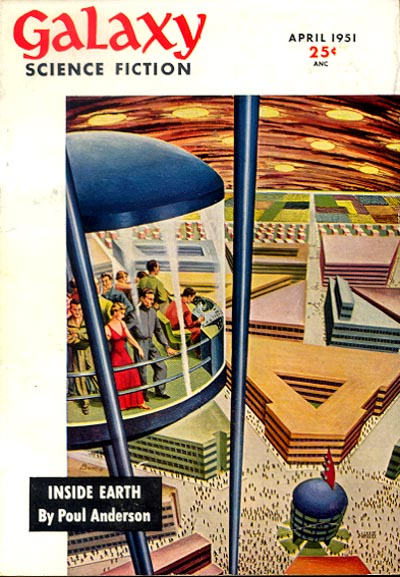
Anderson's novelette "Inside Earth" was the cover story in the April 1951 issue of Galaxy Science Fiction.

== See also ==
- Golden Age of Science Fiction

== Sources ==
- Miesel, Sandra (1978). Against Time's Arrow: The High Crusade of Poul Anderson. Borgo Press. ISBN 0-89370-124-6.
- Tuck, Donald H. (1974). The Encyclopedia of Science Fiction and Fantasy. Chicago: Advent. pp. 8–10. ISBN 0-911682-20-1.
