= Michael Longcor =

Folk and filk singer

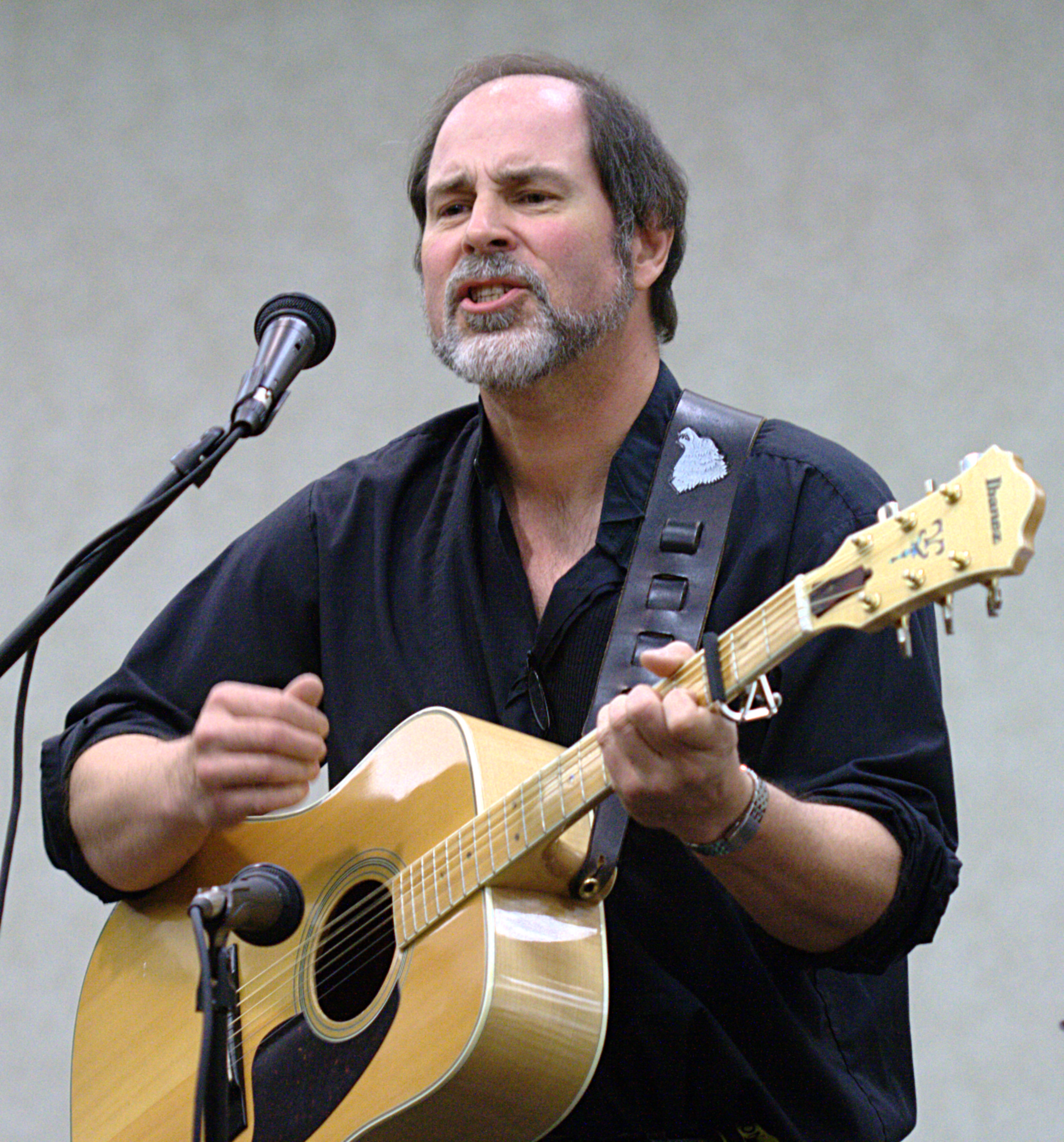
- Michael Longcor at DucKon 16

Background information
- Born: United States
- Genres: Filk, folk

Michael Longcor is a folk and filk singer. His songs span a range of topics including military history, Indiana history, and humor. He has won six Pegasus Awards and has been nominated for six others. His music has appeared on Dr. Demento and on NPR's Folksong Festival, and has provided the background for a BBC documentary on Rudyard Kipling.

He is a member of the Society for Creative Anachronism, in which he is known as Moonwulf Starkaaderson. As a member of the SCA, he has been king of the Middle Kingdom twice and served as baron of the Barony of Rivenstar (Lafayette and West Lafayette, Indiana) from its foundation until April 2016. He is also a member of the Dorsai Irregulars, having been inducted in 1976. Longcor was inducted into the Filk Hall of Fame in 2014.

== Awards ==
- 1992 Pegasus Award for best performer
- 1993 Pegasus Award for best humorous song ("Rhinotillexomania")
- 1995 Pegasus Award for best performer
- 1995 Pegasus Award for best military song ("When Tenskwatawa Sings")
- 1996 Pegasus Award for best eerie song ("Monster in My Head")
- 2003 Pegasus Award for best filk song ("Shooting Star")

== Discography ==
- Storm, Wind and Flame

Songs from this album appear in Ann C. Crispin's novel Storms of Destiny

- Walking the Wilderness
- Boarding Party
- Lovers, Heroes and Rogues
- Heartburn
- Kitchen Junk Drawer
- Dangerous Heroes
- Norman & Saxon
- Drunken Angel
- Field of Fire
- What's a Hoosier?
- Owlflight
