= Kathy Mar =

American filk singer (1951–2026)

- Mar at CONduit 17 in Salt Lake City, Utah (2007)

Background information
- Born: January 7, 1951
- Origin: Denver, Colorado, United States
- Died: September 23, 2026 (aged 75)
- Genre: Filk
- Instrument: guitar
- Website: www.xocolatl.com/kathy

Kathy Mar (from Chinese Ma by analogy with non-rhotic accents) was an American filk singer. She co-started an informal movement called The Dandelion Conspiracy to make general science fiction conventions more friendly to filk. A dandelion was chosen to show that filkers would keep coming back to science fiction conventions, like a dandelion in the sidewalk. Thus, the dandelion has become an unofficial filk symbol.

== Pegasus Awards ==
- 1989 — Best Filk Song - Arafel's Song (Tree of Swords & Jewels) (with Mercedes Lackey)
- 1989 — Best Writer/Composer
- 1991 — Best Love Song - Velveteen
- 1993 — Best Writer/Composer
- 1994 — Best Filk Song - Drink Up the River
- 1996 — Best Filk Song - When Giants Walked
- 2004 — Best Writer/Composer
- 2024 — Best Classic Filk Song - Flowers for Algernon

== Albums ==
- Songbird — Off Centaur (cassette OCP-24) 1982
- On a Bright Wind — Off Centaur (cassette OCP-36) 1984
- Bamboo Wind — Off Centaur (cassette OCP-54) 1985
- Plus Ca Change — Thor Records (cassette FK1003) 1988
- Plus C'est La Même Chose — Thor Records (cassette FK1006) 1990
- Made By Magic — with Zander Nyrond, Dandelion Digital CD DD-005CD, 1994
- My Favorite Sings — Prometheus Music CD PM-1000, 1999
- Plus Ca Change / Plus C'est La Même Chose — DragonsGate Music CD 2000
- Kathy Mar - Live — Love Song Productions CD/DVD LSP2004 2009
