= ConnectiCon =

Multi-genre entertainment and comic convention

- Connecticon logo as of 2020
- Status: Active
- Genre: Multi-genre
- Venue: Connecticut Convention Center
- Locations: Hartford, Connecticut, U.S
- Coordinates: 41°45′51.84″N 72°40′10.92″W
- Country: United States
- Inaugurated: July 18, 2003; 23 years ago
- Most recent: July 16, 2026
- Next event: July 15, 2027
- Attendance: 15,186 in 2016
- Organizer: ConnectiCon, LLC
- Website: connecticon.org

ConnectiCon is a multi-genre pop culture convention held annually in Hartford, Connecticut. Established in 2003 by Matthew Daigle and Briana Benn-Mirandi, it is Connecticut's longest running pop culture convention.

Initially a three-day event, ConnectiCon's popularity led to an expansion in 2014, transforming it into a four-day event from Thursday to Sunday.

== Events ==
The convention includes 24-hour screening rooms of full-length features and episodes of classic and modern science fiction and anime titles and sponsorship by GameStop, which also provides consoles for tournament and casual video gaming.

Gaming—including board, card, miniature and role-playing—are featured. The convention also features an Artist Alley, an art show, an exhibitor hall, panels and workshops throughout the convention. Additionally, larger events such as a masquerade, Cosplay Chess, Death Match, Dating Game, and Nerd Prom are held. Other entertainment includes artistic guest performances such as from Super Art Fight.

== Locations, dates and guests ==
Dates	Venue	Attendance	Notable Guests	Sources
July 18-20, 2003	University of Hartford	850	Glenn Shadix, James Ernest, Brian Clevinger	
July 16-18, 2004	University of Hartford	1,800	Ian Jones-Quartey, Scott Ramsoomair, Michael Sinterniklaas	
July 15-17, 2005	Connecticut Convention Center	2,800	Freezepop, Tiffany Grant	
July 7-9, 2006	Connecticut Convention Center	3,500	Ananth Hirsh	
July 13-15, 2007	Connecticut Convention Center	5,210	Vic Mignogna	
August 1-3, 2008	Connecticut Convention Center	6,684	Brian Clevinger, Meredith Gran, Jeph Jacques, Michele Knotz, Ananth Panagariya, Ethan Phillips, Robert Picardo, Scott Ramsoomair	
July 31 - August 2, 2009	Connecticut Convention Center	7,391	Brian Clevinger, Rob DenBleyker, Lar DeSouza, Carlos Ferro, KC Green, Brad Guigar, Jeph Jacques, Michele Knotz, Matt Melvin, Randall Munroe, Ananth Panagariya, Scott Ramsoomair, David Stanworth, Kristofer Straub, Cristina Vee, David Willis	
July 9-11, 2010	Connecticut Convention Center	8,000	Michele Knotz, Matt Melvin, Ananth Panagariya, Scott Ramsoomair, Bill Rogers, David Willis	
July 8-10, 2011	Connecticut Convention Center	8,050	Steve Belledin, Emily Care Boss, Brian Clevinger, Rob DenBleyker, Nick Landis, Matt Melvin, Ananth Panagariya, Scott Ramsoomair, Christopher Corey Smith, Jon St. John, David Stanworth, Cristina Vee, Veronica Vera, David Willis	
July 13-15, 2012	Connecticut Convention Center	10,700	Brentalfloss, Chris Cason, Brian Clevinger, Jim Cummings, Rob DenBleyker, Carlos Ferro, Nick Landis, Jamie Noguchi, Doug Walker, Amanda Winn-Lee	
July 12-14, 2013	Connecticut Convention Center	12,665	Brentalfloss, Brian Clevinger, Nicki Clyne, Jim Cummings, Elaine Cunningham, Neil Grayston, KC Green, Lauren Landa, Nick Landis, Jamie Noguchi, Paul and Storm, Tahmoh Penikett, Marina Sirtis, Jon St. John, Michael Trucco, Doug Walker	
July 10-13, 2014	Connecticut Convention Center	11,739	Rob Balder, Tim Buckley, Jennifer Hale, Richard Horvitz, Steve Kenson, Maurice LaMarche, Lauren Landa, Brittany Lauda, John Patrick Lowrie, Marble Hornets, Ellen McLain, Rob Paulsen, Rikki Simons, Janet Varney, Doug Walker	
July 9-12, 2015	Connecticut Convention Center	12,645	Karan Ashley, Amber Benson, Chris Bevins, Dameon Clarke, D.C. Douglas, Carlos Ferro, Dean Haglund, Maurice LaMarche, Phil LaMarr, Marble Hornets, Jason Narvy, Nichelle Nichols, Jamie Noguchi, Paul Schrier, Dana Snyder, Austin St. John, Jon St. John, George Takei, Janet Varney, Veronica Vera, Kari Wahlgren, David Yost	
July 7-10, 2016	Connecticut Convention Center	15,186	Sean Astin, Keith Baker, Johnny Yong Bosch, Rob DenBleyker, Michael Dorn, Jess Harnell, Walter Koenig, Lauren Landa, Linda Larkin, Brittany Lauda, Erica Mendez, Rob Paulsen, John Rhys-Davies, R.A. Salvatore, Keith Silverstein, Super Art Fight, Veronica Vera, Nana Visitor, Doug Walker	
July 6-9, 2017	Connecticut Convention Center	N/A	Leah Clark, Brian Clevinger, Michaela Dietz, Gigi Edgley, Kellen Goff, Darrel Guilbeau, Virginia Hey, Sylvester McCoy, Joel McDonald, Randy Milholland, Cassandra Lee Morris, Jody Lynn Nye, Malcolm Ray, Jad Saxton, Jeremy Shada, Lawrence Simpson, Super Art Fight, Courtenay Taylor, Austin Tindle, Doug Walker	
July 12-15, 2018	Connecticut Convention Center	N/A	Cal Dodd, Troy Baker, Linda Ballantyne, Steve Blum, Jason Fry, Katie Griffin, Deedee Magno Hall, Vanessa Marshall, Nolan North, Ron Rubin, Jon St. John	
July 11-14, 2019	Connecticut Convention Center	N/A	Austin St. John, Danny Tamberelli, David Sobolov, Jake Paque, Jim Cummings, Johnny Yong Bosch, Karan Ashley, Michael Maronna, Tara Sands, Zach Callison	
September 9-12, 2021	Connecticut Convention Center	N/A	Aaron Dismuke, Aaron Roberts, Alexis Tipton, Austin Tindle, Barry Gordon, Billy West, Brian Lee Durfee, Caitlin Glass, Cam Clarke, Carlos Ferro, Cathy Cavadini, Derick Snow, Elizabeth Maxwell, Eric Vale, Erica Schroeder, George Lowe, Ian Sinclair, Jeremy Inman, Jessie James Grelle, John Jackson Miller, Jon St. John, Leah Clark, Marion G. Harmon, Martha Harms, Megan Mackie, Michael Terracciano, Monica Rial, Rick Heinz, Rob Paulsen, Sandy Manley, Sarah Wiedenheft, Sonny Strait, TeamFourStar, Todd Haberkorn, Townsend Coleman	
July 14-17, 2022	Connecticut Convention Center	N/A	Andy Williams, Amber Lee Connors, Brandon McInnis, Brittney Karbowski, Chris Guerrero, Chuck Huber, Dallas Reid, Dawn Bennett, Gama Martinez, J. Michael Tatum, Jad Saxton, Jamie Marchi, Jarrod Greene, Jason Douglas, Jenny Yokobori, Jesse Guiltmette, Jill Harris, Jody Lynn Nye, John Gremillion, John Swasey, Juan Felipe Sierra, Katelyn Barr, Kip Sabian, Kyle Phillips, Larry Dixon, Lauren Landa, Lindsay Seidel, Mercedes Lackey, Mike McFarland, Olivia Hasler, R. Bruce Elliott, Richard Pini, Rick Heinz, Romulo Bernal, Wendy Pini	
July 20-23, 2023	Connecticut Convention Center	N/A	A. J. Beckles, AmaLee, Anairis Quiñones, Art the Hypnotist, Carlos Ferro, Clifford Chapin, Daniel Peyton, David Matranga, Doug Cockle, Ellyn Stern, Film Reroll, Jon St. John, Justin Cook, Keith DeCandido, Kelly Baskin, Kristen McGuire, Laila Berzins, Landon McDonald, Luci Christian, Marion G. Harmon, Mela Lee, Nicholas Roye, Richard Epcar, Rick Heinz, Ryan Bartley, Sean Chiplock, Stephanie Southerland, Steve Jackson, Tasia Valenza, Tim Buckley, Valeria Rodriguez	
July 18-21, 2024	Connecticut Convention Center	TBD	Abby Trott, Adam McArthur, Allegra Edwards, Andy Allo, Anne Yatco, Anthony Bowling, Beau Billingslea, Bryce Papenbrook, Chris Tergliafera, Christopher Guerrero, Dani Chambers, David McCormack, Griffin Burns, Jon St. John, Jordan Dash Cruz, Kaiji Tang, Keith Silverstein, Kelsey Cruz, Kira Buckland, Lex Lang, Macy Anne Johnson, Mallorie Rodak, Mark Whitten, Melanie Zanetti, Melissa Fahn, Robbie Amell, Sandy Fox, Suzie Yeung, Tyler Walker, Wendee Lee, Wendy Powell, Zeno Robinson	
July 17-20, 2025	Connecticut Convention Center	TBD	AkaneSaotome, Allegra Clark, Anjali Kunapaneni, Barry Yandell, Ben Diskin, BERRY, Brittany Lauda, Bryn Apprill, Channel Awesome (Brad Jones and Doug Walker), Chris Edgerly, Cristina Vee, Daman Mills, Dan Southworth, Debi Derryberry, Emi Lo, Emily Bauer, Erica Schroeder, Faye Mata, Gui Agustini, Holly Chou, Howard Wang, Isaac Robinson-Smith, Jason Griffith, JB Blanc, Jonah Scott, Jon St. John, Jordan Reynolds, Josey Montana McCoy, J. P. Karliak, Kari Wahlgren, Kirk Thornton, Lady Cels, Landon McDonald, Lenore Zann, Lisa Ortiz, Mara Junot, Matt Shipman, Matthew Waterson, Max Mittelman, May Hong, Nicolas Roye, Pete Capella, Ray Chase, Robbie Daymond, Shantel VanSanten, Taryn Cosplay, Wendy Powell	[29]
July 16-19, 2026	Connecticut Convention Center	TBD	Aaron Dismuke, Adam McArthur, Adrian Hough, A. J. Beckles, A. J. LoCascio, AkaneSaotome, Alejandra Reynoso, Alpha Takahashi, Anairis Quiñones, Anne Yatco, Barbara Goodson, Barri (Barracuda Cosplay), BERRY, Billy West, Brian Mathis, Britt Baron, Bryan Massey, Bryce Papenbrook, Cal Dodd, Caleb Pierce, Cassandra Lee Morris, Chris Cason, Cynthia Cranz, Dan Green, Daniel DeSanto, Daniel Marin, Danny Tamberelli, Darren Dunstan, David Sobolov, D. C. Douglas, Derick Snow, Eliah Mountjoy, Erica (K-Sisters Cosplay), Erica Luttrell, Eric Stuart, Erik Braa, Greg Berg, Griffin Burns, Jason Marnocha, Jennie Kwan, Jessica Calvello, John Burgmeier, John Eric Bentley, Johnny Yong Bosch, Jon St. John, Jose Marin, Kaiji Tang, Keone Young, Kimberly Brooks, Lee Quick, Linda Young, LittleLuckyCosplay, Marc Biagi, Max Mittelman, May Hong, May Jean Cosplay, Megan Hollingshead, Michael Haigney, Mike Pollock, Ray Chase, R. Bruce Elliott, Reagan Murdock, Robbie Daymond, Ryan Colt Levy, Sarah Natochenny, Sarah Wiedenheft, Steve Blum, Stuart Stone, Suzie Yeung, Tara Sands, Tiya Sircar, Wally Wingert, Xander Mobus, Yoshi Vu	
July 15-18, 2027	Connecticut Convention Center	TBD	TBD	
