= Intervention (convention) =

- Intervention logo
- Status: Defunct
- Genre: Internet Culture
- Venue: Hilton Rockville/Washington D.C.
- Locations: Rockville, Maryland
- Country: United States
- Inaugurated: 2010
- Attendance: 905 in 2013
- Organizer: Onezumi Events Inc., Olivia Durant
- Website: http://www.interventioncon.com

Intervention was a yearly Internet culture convention held in Rockville, Maryland. Intervention (a combination of the words "Internet" and "Convention") highlighted independent artists from all spectrums of creative output who use the Internet as their primary distribution method. The convention hosted panels, workshops, movie showings, music concerts, open gaming, and dance events. Later events added a children's track and live musical performances. Following the 2016 event, organizers placed the convention on hiatus and said a plan would be developed for its return, but this was made impossible following the abrupt failure and bankruptcy of its parent corporation, Onezumi Events.

== Locations and dates ==
Dates	Location	Attendance	Notable guests	Notes
September 10–12, 2010	Hilton Washington DC/Rockville	527	Pete Abrams, Rob Balder, Molly Crabapple, Fred Gallagher, Brad Guigar, Bill Holbrook, Phil Kahn, Steve Napierski, Krishna M. Sadasivam, David Willis	
September 16–18, 2011	Hilton Washington DC/Rockville	734	Pete Abrams, Rob Balder, Matt Blum, Shaenon Garrity, Bill Holbrook, Steve Napierski, David Reddick	Opens: Friday 9/16/2011 12pm, Closes: Sunday 9/18/2011 4pm
September 21–23, 2012	Hilton Washington DC/Rockville	850	Pete Abrams, Rob Balder, Matt Blum, Shaenon Garrity, Steve Napierski	Opens: Friday 9/21/2012 12pm, Closes: Sunday 9/23/2012 4pm
August 23–25, 2013	Hilton Washington DC/Rockville	905	Pete Abrams, Ego Likeness, Mark Frauenfelder, Shaenon Garrity, Hello, The Future!, Steve Napierski, Paul Sabourin, Jeffrey Wells	Opens: Friday 8/23/2013 12pm, Closes: Sunday 8/25/2013 4pm
August 22–24, 2014	Hilton Washington DC/Rockville		Peter Abrams, Rob Balder, Steve Napierski, Kambrea Pratt, Thom Pratt	Opens: Friday 8/22/2014 12pm, Closes: Sunday 8/24/2014 4pm
August 14–16, 2015	Hilton Washington DC/Rockville		Peter Abrams, Terry Molloy, Kambrea Pratt, Thom Pratt	Opens: Friday 8/14/2014 12pm, Closes: Sunday 8/16/2014 4pm
September 16–18, 2016	Hilton Washington DC/Rockville		Peter Abrams, René Auberjonois, Robert Axelrod, Keith R. A. DeCandido, Gigi Edgley, Todd Haberkorn, Alex Kingston, Jon St. John	
