= Super Art Fight =

Art competition

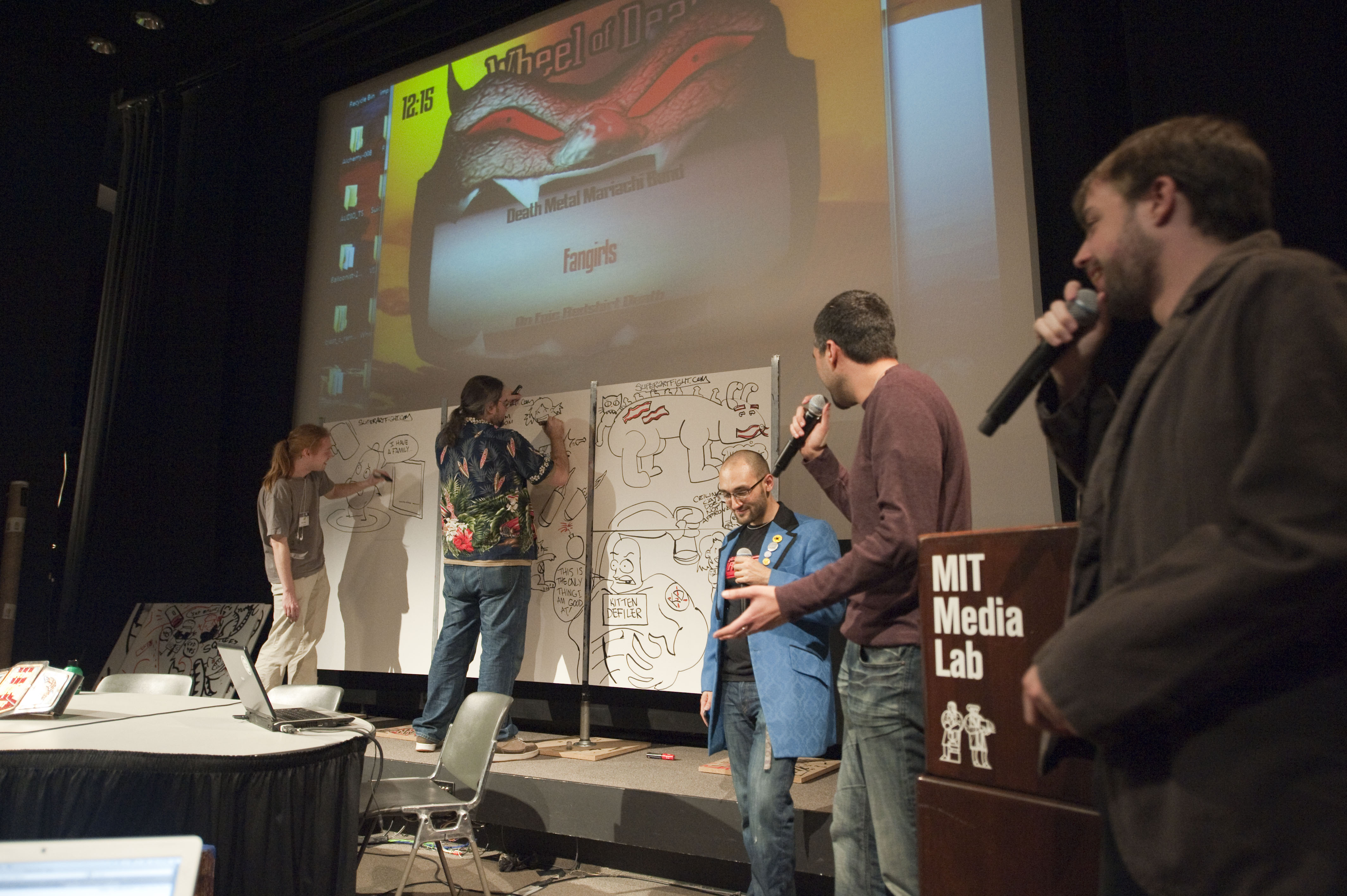
- "The Greatest Live Art Competition in the Known Universe."
- Status: Active
- Genre: Improv Performance Art
- Venue: Katsucon, ConnectiCon, Otakon, MAGfest, Balticon, Small Press Expo, AwesomeCon, ROFLcon, Intervention (convention), Black Cat (Washington, D.C. nightclub), The Ottobar, others
- Locations: Washington, D.C., Baltimore, MD
- Years active: 18
- Founded: 15 February 2008
- Founder: Jamie Noguchi, Nick DiFabbio
- Website: www.superartfight.com

Super Art Fight is a live improvised art competition based in the Washington, D.C.-Baltimore area where artists compete for audience approval by sketching random topics on a mural-sized canvas. The event was birthed at Katsucon in 2008 and has grown to include a rotating roster of artists, a podcast, and online competitions. The main Super Art Fight style involves individual artists (or pairs) facing off in front of a live audience. Topics change throughout the match and the winner is determined by Clap-o-meter/Sound level meter.

As many of the participating artists are webcomic creators, the art is generally in a cartoon or comic style, sometimes with manga and other style influences. Pop culture references are common, as are mentions of memes, classic science fiction movies, and other geek/nerd mainstays. Since debuting in 2008, Super Art Fight has now put on over 100 shows at a wide variety of venues.

== History ==
Super Art Fight was initially thought up during an Iron Artist competition at Katsucon in 2008 by Jamie Noguchi and Nick diFabbio. Noguchi and diFabbio recruited fellow artists, particularly webcomic creators and others on the convention circuit, creating the first Super Art Fight roster. It has become a recurring event at Katsucon as well as other conventions such as Intervention (convention) and has traveled to a wide variety of venues; including bars, clubs, conventions, and university events

Super Art Fight has celebrated May 4 with ThinkGeek, faced off with CollegeHumor, teamed up with the Protomen, and attended Rutgers Geek Week. Events are generally held in the Baltimore-D.C. area but as the event has matured, the range has expanded to the larger Northeast Corridor and other parts of the United States.

== Event style and format ==
Events generally last for several rounds depending on the number of artists attending and the venue. While Super Art Fight is a competition, it often bears more resemblance to a combination of improv comedy and collaborative performance art. Three rounds are most common at convention events.

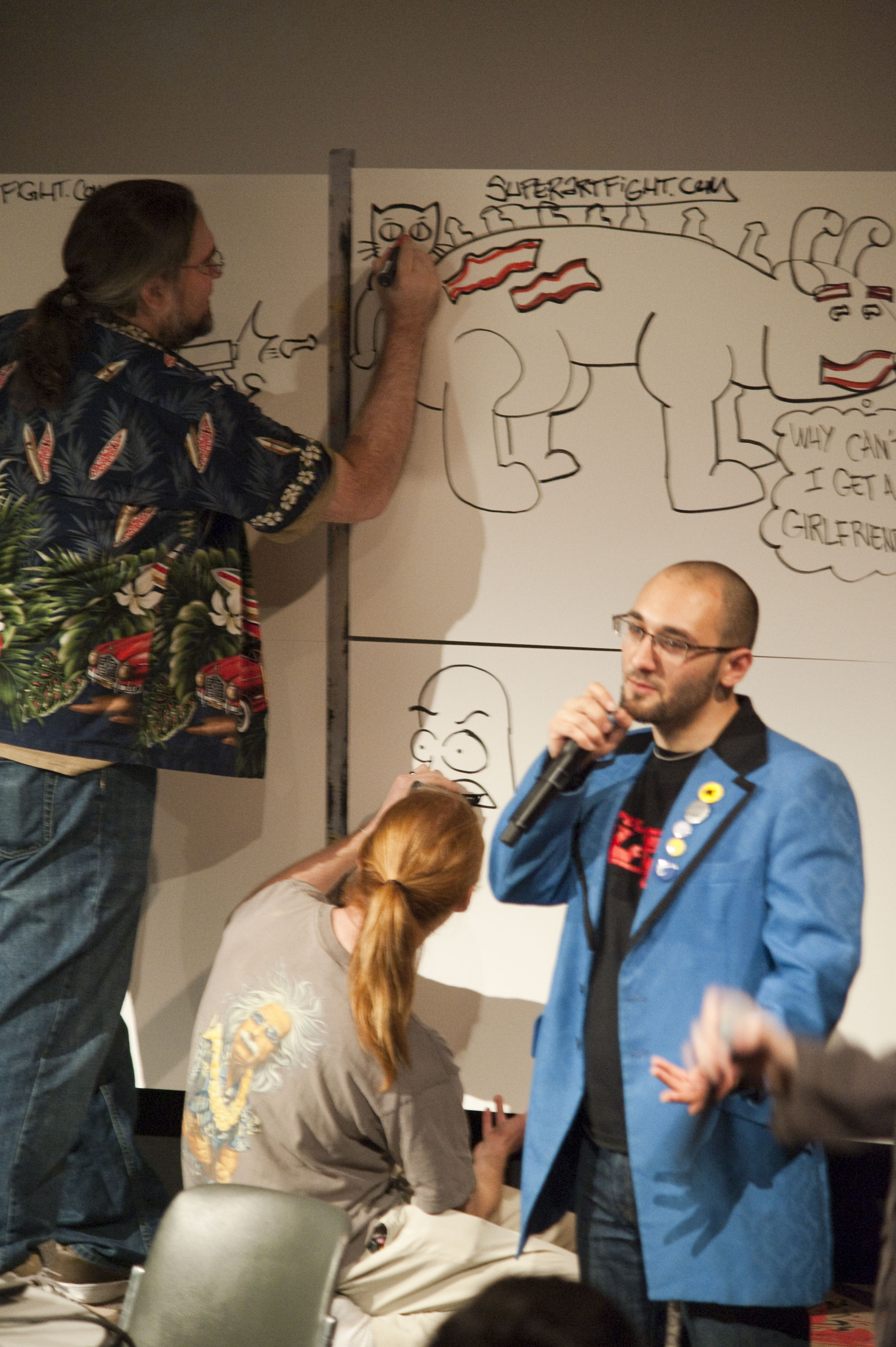
Super Art Fight at ROFLcon 2010

Super Art Fight artists often develop personas that take inspiration from a variety of popular culture influences such as luchadores and pro wrestling. Personas range from simply a nickname to a full costume with props. Many of the artists are creative professionals such as graphic designers and art teachers. A large percentage of the artists have their own webcomics.

In a Super Art Fight match, artists are given a starting topic, often related to the convention or the night's theme, and may draw anywhere on the canvas, including overtop of each other's work. After five minutes (and every five minutes thereafter) the "Wheel of Death" is spun, selecting a new topic for each artist, with the bout lasting 25 minutes total. Topics are submitted by fans online and curated by the Super Art Fight staff. Competitors may request a topic respin once per match

Winner is chosen via a sound level meter (in a live match) or voting (online). The canvas is often auctioned off for charity. At Katsucon, Super Art Fight canvases are part of the charity auction for Relay for Life for the American Cancer Society.

== Super Art Fight Unleashed ==
Due to the fact that many Super Art Fight shows, particularly ones at anime conventions and science fiction conventions, are all-ages events, an Unleashed version of the show was created. The Unleashed shows originally used topics from Cards Against Humanity, but have since evolved to use suggested topics that would otherwise be inappropriate and/or generally terrible. Instead of being allowed one respin per match, competitors may respin for every topic but must combine their first and second spins in their artwork

Cameras are not permitted at Super Art Fight Unleashed due to the NC-17 nature of the event.

== Artists and performers ==
=== Super Art Fight staff ===
- Ross Nover - Co-host
- Marty Day - Co-host
- Adam Forejt - Referee
- Ryan K-Rai Stinnett - Live Event DJ

=== Super Art Fight Roster ===
- Michael Bracco - "Baron Von Sexyful"
- Jamie Baldwin - "The Judge” / "Bunny"
- Kelsey Wailes - "Stompadon" / "Dr. Professor Hemoglobin, MD, PhD, LMNOP"
- Bryan “Old Man” Prindiville
- Dann Malihom - “Charm City Shinobi, PhD”
- Erin Laue - "Red Erin" / "Olivia Oblivia" / "Corduroy"
  - Current Pixelweight Champion (Red Erin)
- Alex Kazanas - "Two Drink Alex" / “Your Uncle Al”
  - Current Solo Champion (Your Uncle Al)
- Jessi Pascal - "Shoujo-A-Go-Go"
  - Current Tag Team Champion
- Colleen Parker - "Killer Colleen" / "Princess of Darkness" / "The Dungeonmaster"
- Mike Donohue - "The Fighting Fanboy"
- Steve Boyland - "Stevie Speed"
- Nicole Roberts - "Wisteria"
- Dee Yazak - "Mistress Doomcannon"
- Zee Ellis - "Vivienne Shamwood" / “Groovy”
- Margaret Huey - "DIETANIUM"
- Megan Vanessa Richards - "Rave Royale"
  - Current Tag Team Champion
- Monique Graham - "Ms. Inkwell"

=== Inactive Artists ===
- Brandon “Bearpuncher” Chalmers - Referee emeritus
- Jamie Noguchi - "Angry Zen Master"
- Nick DiFabbio / Nick Borkowicz- "Ghostfreehood"
- Chris “Impact” Impink
- "Stabby" Abby Boeh
- Henry Alexander - “The Business”
- Darl “Apocalypse” Gnau
- Ashley “MarkerMancer” Katz
- El Russo Rojo
- Greg Benge - "Dr. Destructo Dome" / "Periwinkle the Wizard"
- Brandon J. Carr - “The Nicest Man in Art Fight”
- Chelsea Grose - “Duchess Von Sexyful”
- Gloria Ngo - "The Valkyrie"
- Chris Scott - "General Stormsketch"
- Izzy Kemp - "Slash LaRoux"

=== Guest artists ===
- Yuko Ota - Artist: Johnny Wander
- Ananth Hirsh
- Steve Bennett
- Lar deSouza
- Obsidian
- Alina Pete
- Joe Dunn
- Steve Napierski
- Peelander Yellow - Member: Peelander-Z
- Chris Flick
- Dirk Tiede
- Kaitlin Smallwood
- Robin Edwards
- Danielle Corsetto
- Jo Chen
- Zach Weinersmith
- Tak Toyoshima
- H. Caldwell Tanner
- Steve Ellis
- Tina Pratt
- Bree Rubin
- Ami Bogin
- Alex Heberling
- Josh Taylor
- Garth Graham
- Bill Ellis
- Frank Cho
- Art Alchemy Circle
- Christopher Hastings
- Stan Sakai
- Lea Hernandez
- Ethan Nicolle
- Braden Lamb - Artist: Adventure Time comic
- Shelli Paroline - Artist: Adventure Time comic
- Joe Hunter
- Rob Denbleyker - Artist: Cyanide & Happiness
- Scott Wegener - Artist: Atomic Robo
- Clay Yount - Artist: Rob and Elliot, part of Boxcar Comics
- ND Stevenson
- Shawn Coss - Artist: Cyanide & Happiness
