= Katsucon =

Anime convention in the Washington, D.C. metro area

Coordinates: 38°46′54.5″N 77°0′59.5″W

- The official Katsucon logo
- Status: Active
- Genre: Anime, Manga, Japanese pop culture
- Venue: Gaylord National Resort & Convention Center
- Location: National Harbor, Maryland
- Country: United States
- Inaugurated: 1995
- Attendance: 17,005 in 2016
- Organizer: Katsucon Entertainment, Inc.
- Website: http://www.katsucon.org/

Katsucon is an annual three-day anime convention held during February at the Gaylord National Resort & Convention Center in National Harbor, Maryland. It is traditionally held in February over Presidents Day weekend and was previously held in various locations around Virginia and Washington, D.C. The basis of the convention's name is not clear, as "katsu" in the Japanese language has various meanings, including pork.

== Programming ==
The convention typically offers anime music video screenings, an art show, artist alley, charity auction, costume contests, cosplay chess, dealers room, game shows, formal ball, karaoke, a maid cafe, masquerade, musical performances, panels, rave, workshops, video gaming, and video screenings. Katsucon has Japanese Culture programming known as the Japanese Cultural Institute. Katsucon's charity events in 2012 benefited the American Cancer Society, Anime Aid, and Cherry Tree Maintenance Endowment Fund.

== History ==
Katsucon started in 1995 at the Holiday Inn Executive Center in Virginia Beach, and moved to locations around the Washington metropolitan area after its third year due to growth. In 2002 the convention had a membership cap of 7,000 people, unsuccessfully attempted to move to the Baltimore Marriott Waterfront, and in 2003 returned to the Hyatt Regency Crystal City. Katsucon ran for extra days in 2003 due to hundreds of attendees being trapped by road closures during the North American blizzard of 2003. Guests and staff ran panels and opened video rooms. Due to growth, the convention in 2005 moved to the Marriott Crystal Gateway and Sheraton Crystal City from the Hyatt Regency Crystal City. The hotels were unconnected and one had construction ongoing, which caused problems including the first two floors of the hotel having no heat, long dealers room lines, and panels being held in larger hotel rooms. The convention from 2006 to 2008 was located at the Omni Shoreham Hotel, but in 2007 suffered crowd control and logistics problems. For 2009 the convention returned to the Hyatt Regency Crystal City and suffered from overcrowding, even with an attendance cap of 6,000. Katsucon 2009 had over 300 volunteers on staff.

The convention for several years had been experiencing problems with convention space and in 2006 began discussions about moving to the Gaylord. In 2010 Katsucon moved to the Gaylord National Resort & Convention Center and the February 9–10, 2010 North American blizzard occurred. Attendees traveling to the convention encountered icy conditions and congested traffic, with the weather preventing delivery of the cons badges on Thursday, delaying registration until Friday. The convention in 2011 released a revised Fan Art policy due to controversy over its wording. Due to an incident where a sex offender made contact with a minor at Katsucon 2010, the convention announced that it would attempt to check its pre-registration lists against sex offender databases and deny attendance to possible threats. In 2012, the convention hosted the United States preliminary round for the World Cosplay Summit. The winner from the twenty-two teams entered was Coconut Bubble Sex Cosplay. The masquerade began seating late and was an hour late to start. Due to the convention's attendance growth, they ran out of badges in 2012 and returned to the Gaylord in 2013. In 2013, the convention hosted the United States Eastern Regional qualifier for the World Cosplay Summit. The dealers room in 2013 suffered from crowding on Sunday, and they had to limit the number of attendees who entered.

The February 11–17, 2014 North American winter storm occurred on the days before the convention, causing travel disruptions for attendees. The convention did not share the Gaylord with other events in 2014 and made the dealers' room larger. Registration experienced significant delays due to staff and organization issues. Katsucon again held events for the World Cosplay Summit. The dress code was changed by the convention and hotel for 2016. Katsucon 2021 was cancelled due to the COVID-19 pandemic. Katsucon 2022 had COVID-19 policies that required masks and vaccination. During Katsucon 2025, a pipe burst in the Artists Alley on Friday, delaying its opening on Saturday.

=== Event history ===
Date	Location	Attend.	Guest
February 17–19, 1995	Holiday Inn Executive Center; Virginia Beach, Virginia	500	Steve Bennett, Robert DeJesus, Ben Dunn, Danny Fahs, Johji Manabe, Izumi Matsumoto, Fred Perry, Jan Scott-Frazier, Sue Shambaugh, Jason Waltrip, John Waltrip, and Yoshihiro Yonezawa.
March 8–10, 1996	Holiday Inn Executive Center; Virginia Beach, Virginia	800	Steve Bennett, Robert DeJesus, Colleen Doran, Ben Dunn, Tim Eldred, Richard "Pocky" Kim, Steve Kyte, Bruce Lewis, Michael Ling, Katsura Masakazu, Helen McCarthy, John Ott, Steve Pearl, Fred Perry, Jan Scott-Frazier, and Toren Smith.
March 7–9, 1997	Holiday Inn Executive Center; Virginia Beach, Virginia	800	Steve Bennett, Robert DeJesus, Colleen Doran, Pablo 'Doc' Fraga, and Jan Scott-Frazier.
February 27 – March 1, 1998	Radisson Plaza Hotel at Mark Center; Alexandria, Virginia	1,400	Ippongi Bang, Steve Bennett, Robert DeJesus, Colleen Doran, Kuni Kimura, Steve Pearl, Fred Perry and Jan Scott-Frazier.
February 12–14, 1999	Hyatt Regency Crystal City; Arlington, Virginia	1,800	Steve Bennett, Michael Brady, Colleen Doran, Hiroki Hayashi, Kuni Kimura, Trish Ledoux, Tristan MacAvery, Heather Martin, Haruhiko Mikimoto, Steve Pearl, Fred Perry, Jan Scott-Frazier, Jeff Thompson, and Toshifumi Yoshida.
February 11–13, 2000	Hyatt Regency Crystal City; Arlington, Virginia	2,300	Will Allison, Yoshitaka Amano, Steve Bennett, Jessica Calvello, Robert DeJesus, Colleen Doran, Pat Duke, Newton Ewell, Lea Hernandez, Teruo Kakuta, Shin Kurokawa, Trish Ledoux, Tristan MacAvery, Lisa Ortiz, Steve Pearl, Fred Perry, Ryo Ramiya, Mark E. Rogers, Tomoko Saito, Rikki Simons, Jeff Thompson, Hiroyuki Utatane, Tavisha Wolfgarth-Simons, and Toshifumi Yoshida.
February 16–18, 2001	Hyatt Regency Crystal City; Arlington, Virginia	4,000	Steve Bennett, Austell "DJ Asu" Callwood, Jessica Calvello, Kara Dennison, Colleen Doran, Newton Ewell, Robert Fenelon, Lea Hernandez, Amy Howard-Wilson, Humouring the Fates, Noboru Ishiguro, David Kaye, Shin Kurokawa, Tristan MacAvery, Steve Pearl, Fred Perry, Mark E. Rogers, Jan Scott-Frazier, Jeff Thompson, Shawn the Touched, and Toshifumi Yoshida.
February 15–17, 2002	Baltimore Marriott Waterfront; Baltimore, Maryland	3,000	Hirofumi Adachi, Kevin Bennett, Steve Bennett, Austell "DJ Asu" Callwood, Jessica Calvello, Sean Carolan, Colleen Doran, Newton Ewell, Robert Fenelon, Noboru Ishiguro, Maria Kawamura, Yukio Kikukawa, Jennifer Moore, Lisa Ortiz, Steve Pearl, Fred Perry, Mark E. Rogers, Sean Schemmel, Jan Scott-Frazier, Michael Sinterniklaas, Doug Smith, Jeff Thompson, Jason Waltrip, John Waltrip, and Toshifumi Yoshida.
February 14–16, 2003	Hyatt Regency Crystal City; Arlington, Virginia	3,200	John Barrett, Kevin Bennett, Steve Bennett, Robert DeJesus, DuelJewel, Newton Ewell, Fred Gallagher, Hiroaki Inoue, Kazuki Kotobuki, Tsukasa Kotobuki, Kristen Nelson, Fred Perry, Mark E. Rogers, Akira Sasaki, Sean Schemmel, Jan Scott-Frazier, Stephanie Sheh, Satoshi Shiki, Rikki Simons, Michael Sinterniklaas, Tavisha Wolfgarth-Simons, and Toshifumi Yoshida.
February 13–15, 2004	Hyatt Regency Crystal City; Arlington, Virginia	4,500	Greg Ayres, Steve Bennett, Michael Coleman, Robert DeJesus, Newton Ewell, Fred Gallagher, Takeshi Honda, Tetsu Inaba, Hidenori Matsubara, Vic Mignogna, Chris Patton, Fred Perry, Monica Rial, Mark E. Rogers, Jan Scott-Frazier, Seraphim, and Michael Sinterniklaas.
February 18–20, 2005	Marriott Crystal Gateway / Sheraton Crystal City; Arlington, Virginia	5,700	Greg Ayres, Katie Bair, Rob Balder, Johnny Yong Bosch, Matt Boyd, Rich Burlew, Jekka Cormier, Richard Ian Cox, Kara Dennison, Mohammad "Hawk" Haque, Kyle Hebert, Lea Hernandez, Tetsu Inaba, Janyse Jaud, Trish Ledoux, Christy Lijewski, Dave Lister, Ian McConville, Range Murata, Nami, Lisa Ortiz, Ananth Panagariya, Fred Perry, Psycho le Cému, Scott Ramsoomair, Monica Rial, Rikki Simons, Michael Sinterniklaas, Michael "Mookie" Terracciano, Jes Weigand, Tavisha Wolfgarth-Simons, and Toshifumi Yoshida.
February 17–19, 2006	Omni Shoreham Hotel; Washington, D.C.	6,400	Akiko, Greg Ayres, Steve Bennett, Matt Boyd, Richard Ian Cox, Robert DeJesus, Barb Fischer, Shawn Handyside, Mohammad "Hawk" Haque, Onezumi Hartstein, Joel Heyman, Chris Impink, Tetsu Inaba, Larom Lancaster, Trish Ledoux, Dave Lister, Maro, Ian McConville, Mike McFarland, Kirby Morrow, Jamie Noguchi, Ananth Panagariya, Fred Perry, Scott Ramsoomair, Jason Saldana, Salia, Jan Scott-Frazier, Rikki Simons, Michael Sinterniklaas, Gustavo Sorola, Mr "New Jack" Takuro, Michael "Mookie" Terracciano, Chris "mc chris" Ward, Tom Wayland, Jes Weigand, Tavisha Wolfgarth-Simons, Koshi Yasuhiro, and Toshifumi Yoshida.
February 16–18, 2007	Omni Shoreham Hotel; Washington, D.C.	7,000	Greg Ayres, Rob Balder, Steve Bennett, Nick Borkowicz, Richard Ian Cox, Marty Day, Emily DeJesus, Robert DeJesus, Kara Dennison, Garth Graham, Shawn Handyside, Mohammad "Hawk" Haque, James Harknell, Onezumi Hartstein, Chris Impink, Larom Lancaster, Trish Ledoux, Dave Lister, Chris "Kilika" Malone, Mike McFarland, Jamie Noguchi, Rosscott Nover, Ananth Panagariya, Peelander-Z, Fred Perry, Bryan J. Prindiville, Antimere Robinson, Annette Roman, Jan Scott-Frazier, Michael Sinterniklaas, Jerry Stephens, Michael "Mookie" Terracciano, Brian Wilson, Walden Wong, and Toshifumi Yoshida.
February 15–17, 2008	Omni Shoreham Hotel; Washington, D.C.	6,300	Robert V. Aldrich, Greg Ayres, Rob Balder, Steve Bennett, Nick Borkowicz, Johnny Yong Bosch, Marty Day, echostream, Josh Elder, Newton Ewell, Eyeshine, Kaja Foglio, Phil Foglio, Geek Comedy Tour, Garth Graham, Tiffany Grant, Brad Guigar, Mohammad "Hawk" Haque, James Harknell, Onezumi Hartstein, Chris Hastings, Chris Hazelton, Matt Herms, Michele Knotz, Larom Lancaster, Dave Lister, Chris "Kilika" Malone, Steve Napierski, Jamie Noguchi, Ananth Panagariya, James Peay, Bill Rogers, Michael Sinterniklaas, David Stanworth, Michael "Mookie" Terracciano, and Brian Wilson.
February 13–15, 2009	Hyatt Regency Crystal City; Arlington, Virginia	6,000 (Note: Attendance was capped at 6,000 paid attendees.)	Atomic Box, Aural Vampire, Rob Balder, Steve Bennett, Nick Borkowicz, Marty Day, Barb Fischer, Kaja Foglio, Phil Foglio, Darren J. Gendron, Caitlin Glass, Brad Guigar, Mohammad "Hawk" Haque, James Harknell, Onezumi Hartstein, Chris Impink, Dave Kellett, Roland Kelts, Trish Ledoux, Chris "Kilika" Malone, Jamie Noguchi, Tony Oliver, Ananth Panagariya, Bryan J. Prindiville, Michael Sinterniklaas, Kristofer Straub, Michael "Mookie" Terracciano, Robert Thomas, Cristina Vee, YMCK, and Toshifumi Yoshida.
February 12–14, 2010	Gaylord National Resort & Convention Center; National Harbor, Maryland		Robert V. Aldrich, Yunmao Ayakawa, Christopher Ayres, Greg Ayres, Jennie Breeden, Austell "DJ Asu" Callwood, Jo Chen, Newton Ewell, Geek Comedy Tour, Garth Graham, Darrel Guilbeau, Mike Hall, Mohammad "Hawk" Haque, Charlene Ingram, Kittyhawk, Dave Lister, Mike McFarland, Vic Mignogna, Tony Oliver, Ananth Panagariya, Adam Sheehan, Temp Sound Solutions, Michael "Mookie" Terracciano, Ryan Thompson, Unicorn Table, Maxey Whitehead, and Steve Yun.
February 18–20, 2011	Gaylord National Resort & Convention Center; National Harbor, Maryland	7,250	Robert V. Aldrich, Yunmao Ayakawa, Christopher Ayres, Greg Ayres, Steve Bennett, Kevin Bolk, Juliet Cesario, The Clockwork Dolls, Newton Ewell, Barb Fischer, Geek Comedy Tour, Darren J. Gendron, Caitlin Glass, Garth Graham, Todd Haberkorn, Mike Hall, James Harknell, Onezumi Hartstein, Chris Impink, Kittyhawk, Linda Le, Lemon Drop Kick, Mike McFarland, Mary Elizabeth McGlynn, Vic Mignogna, Misako Rocks!, Scott Simpson, Michael Sinterniklaas, Ryan Thompson, and Alexis Tipton.
February 17–19, 2012	Gaylord National Resort & Convention Center; National Harbor, Maryland	9,142 (Note: Attendance figures were revised from 12,614 due to an error.)	Robert V. Aldrich, Christopher Ayres, Greg Ayres, Chris Bevins, T. Campbell, The Clockwork Dolls, Jillian Coglan, Samurai Dan Coglan, Danielle Corsetto, Richard Epcar, Geek Comedy Tour, Garth Graham, Jessie James Grelle, Yaya Han, James Harknell, Onezumi Hartstein, Kyle Hebert, Kazha, Kiryu, Linda Le, Meagan Marie, Izumi Matsumoto, Randy Milholland, Stan Sakai, Jan Scott-Frazier, Ellyn Stern, Symphonic Anime Orchestra, J. Michael Tatum, and Steve Yun.
February 15–17, 2013	Gaylord National Resort & Convention Center; National Harbor, Maryland	10,686	Joshua Adams, Christopher Ayres, Greg Ayres, Steve Bennett, Steve Blum, Kevin Bolk, T. Campbell, Jillian Coglan, Samurai Dan Coglan, Crispin Freeman, Geek Comedy Tour, Darren J. Gendron, Garth Graham, Mike Hall, Yaya Han, James Harknell, Onezumi Hartstein, Danny Kang, Phil Khan, Uke Li, Dave Lister, Jamie Marchi, Monica Rial, Bill Rogers, Rikki Simons, Michael Sinterniklaas, The Sound Bee HD, Super Art Fight, Symphonic Anime Orchestra, Michael "Mookie" Terracciano, Ryan Thompson, Lisle Wilkerson, and Tavisha Wolfgarth-Simons.
February 14–16, 2014	Gaylord National Resort & Convention Center; National Harbor, Maryland	12,970	Christopher Ayres, Greg Ayres, Steve Bennett, Brian Boling, Kevin Bolk, T. Campbell, Richard Epcar, Kaja Foglio, Phil Foglio, Geek Comedy Tour, Garth Graham, Yaya Han, Richard Horvitz, Greg Houser, Phil Kahn, Kate A. Lebherz-Gelinas, Kevin McKeever, Svetlana Quindt, Bill Rogers, Rikki Simons, Ellyn Stern, Tom Stidman, Super Art Fight, Symphonic Anime Orchestra, Tainted Reality, Michael "Mookie" Terracciano, Lex Winter, and Tavisha Wolfgarth-Simons.
February 13–15, 2015	Gaylord National Resort & Convention Center; National Harbor, Maryland	15,444	Bennett Abara, Christopher Ayres, Greg Ayres, Gina Biggs, Eirik Blackwolf, T. Campbell, Chalk Twins, Jillian Coglan, Samurai Dan Coglan, Vincent Corazza, Michelle Czajkowski, Robbie Daymond, Geek Comedy Tour, Rusty Gilligan, Garth Graham, Jessie James Grelle, Yaya Han, Chris Hazelton, Greg Houser, Jerry Jewell, Phil Kahn, Megan Lavey-Heaton, Cherami Leigh, Mike McFarland, Isabelle Melançon, Matthew Mercer, Giada Pancaccini, Svetlana Quindt, Tyson Rinehart, Bill Rogers, Leo Saunders, Super Art Fight, Michael "Mookie" Terracciano, Uzuhi, Cristina Vee, and Lex Winter.
February 12–14, 2016	Gaylord National Resort & Convention Center; National Harbor, Maryland	17,005	Christopher Ayres, Greg Ayres, Steve Bennett, Eirik Blackwolf, Jennie Breeden, T. Campbell, DeAnna Davis, Lucien Dodge, Geek Comedy Tour, Garth Graham, Todd Haberkorn, Mike Hall, Kyle Hebert, Greg Houser, Phil Kahn, Kazha, Fox Keegan, Krystal LaPorte, Jamie Marchi, Joel McDonald, Kass McGann, Kevin McKeever, Erica Mendez, Destiny Nickelsen, Jessica Nigri, Giada Pancaccini, Bill Rogers, Leo Saunders, Mandy Seley, Ian Sinclair, Super Art Fight, J. Michael Tatum, Michael "Mookie" Terracciano, Ryan Thompson, Austin Tindle, David Vincent, Lex Winter, and Steve Yun.
February 17–19, 2017	Gaylord National Resort & Convention Center; National Harbor, Maryland		Bennett Abara, Christopher Ayres, Greg Ayres, Steve Bennett, Eirik Blackwolf, Jennie Breeden, Robbie Daymond, Darin De Paul, Kara Edwards, Geek Comedy Tour, Garth Graham, Greg Houser, Jerry Jewell, Brittney Karbowski, Fox Keegan, Cherami Leigh, Jamie Marchi, Reni Mimura, Monica Rial, Bill Rogers, Leo Saunders, Mandy Seley, Micah Solusod, Super Art Fight, Michael "Mookie" Terracciano, and A.K. Wirru.
February 16–18, 2018	Gaylord National Resort & Convention Center; National Harbor, Maryland		Dino Andrade, Anjali Bhimani, Eirik Blackwolf, Steve Blum, Colleen Clinkenbeard, Jonny Cruz, Robbie Daymond, Caitlin Glass, Joshua Hart, Greg Houser, Fox Keegan, Mary Elizabeth McGlynn, Vic Mignogna, Cassandra Lee Morris, Tony Oliver, Giada Pancaccini, Josh Petersdorf, Leo Saunders, Mandy Seley, Keith Silverstein, The Slants, and Sonny Strait.
February 15–17, 2019	Gaylord National Resort & Convention Center; National Harbor, Maryland		Akira, Robert V. Aldrich, Greg Ayres, Steve Bennett, Eirik Blackwolf, Ray Chase, The Comiku Girls, Robbie Daymond, Greg Houser, Kuniko Kanawa, Fox Keegan, Lantana, Max Mittelman, Trina Nishimura, Katriel Paige, Giada Pancaccini, Carolina Ravassa, Leo Saunders, Mandy Seley, Michael Sinterniklaas, Courtenay Taylor, and Lex Winter.
February 14–16, 2020	Gaylord National Resort & Convention Center; National Harbor, Maryland		Morgan Berry, Johnny Yong Bosch, The Comiku Girls, Geek Comedy Tour, Greg Houser, Initial'L, Lauren Landa, Cherami Leigh, Mike McFarland, Erica Mendez, Bryce Papenbrook, Michelle Ruff, and Lex Winter.
February 18–20, 2022	Gaylord National Resort & Convention Center; National Harbor, Maryland		John Bentley, Griffin Burns, Richard Epcar, Yaya Han, Greg Houser, Jerry Jewell, Billy Kametz, Emi Lo, Zeno Robinson, Ellyn Stern, and Mark Whitten.
February 17-19, 2023	Gaylord National Resort & Convention Center; National Harbor, Maryland		The Comiku Girls, Yaya Han, Jerry Jewell, Linda Le, Emi Lo, Katriel Paige, Anairis Quiñones, Kaiji Tang, David Vincent, Lex Winter, and Anne Yatco.
February 16-18, 2024	Gaylord National Resort & Convention Center; National Harbor, Maryland		Greg Ayres, Griffin Burns, Chris Hackney, Linda Le, Erica Lindbeck, Katriel Paige, Jonah Scott, Keith Silverstein, Paul St. Peter, Lex Winter, Suzie Yeung, and XaaXaa.
February 14-16, 2025	Gaylord National Resort & Convention Center; National Harbor, Maryland		Bill Butts, Aaron Dismuke, Chris Hackney, Yaya Han, Carrie Keranen, Ryan Colt Levy, Kyle McCarley, Landon McDonald, Xander Mobus, Jez Roth, Michael Sinterniklaas, Abby Trott, David Vincent, Sarah Wiedenheft, Lex Winter, and Suzie Yeung.
February 13-15, 2026	Gaylord National Resort & Convention Center; National Harbor, Maryland		Justin Briner, Cowbutt Crunchies, CutiePieSensei, Sarah Hodge-Wetherbe, Katriel Paige, Michelle Rojas, Spirit Bomb, and Lex Winter.

== See also ==
- List of anime conventions
- MAGFest
