= Touch It =

Touch It may refer to:

== Music ==
- "Touch It" (Busta Rhymes song), a song by Busta Rhymes, 2005
- "Touch It" (Monifah song), a song by Monifah, 1998
- "Touch It", a song by Ariana Grande from Dangerous Woman, 2016
- "Touch It", a song by Exo from The War, 2017
- "Touch It", a song by The Vindictives, 2012
- Touch It, comedy album by Raymond and Scum, 2003
