= PartiallyClips =

Webcomic

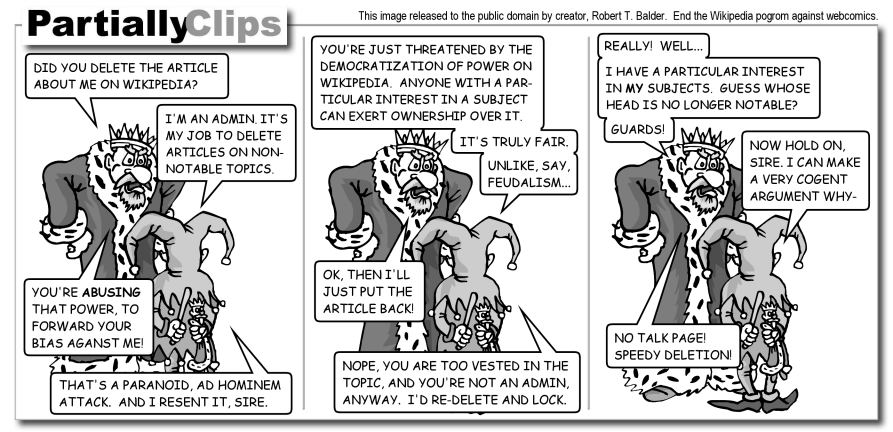
- Author(s): Rob Balder; Tim Crist
- Website: PartiallyClips
- Current status/schedule: defunct
- Launch date: 2002
- End date: 17 June 2015 (see External links)
- Genre(s): Dark humor

PartiallyClips was a webcomic, created by Rob Balder, which ran from 2002 to 2015. At the start of 2010, Balder handed authorship of the comic to Tim Crist, the comedy musician behind Worm Quartet.

== Premise ==
PartiallyClips is a constrained comic. Each three-panel strip consists of a single clip art image – the comic has no original art – repeated and unchanged in each panel, with added speech balloons and/or captions to create the joke.

PartiallyClips tends to use dark humor; frequently, the picture used is rather idyllic, which is common in public-domain clip art, but the added dialogue or captions twist the scene. PartiallyClips also frequently comments on modern life and culture, especially aspects of Internet culture. There are no recurring characters or plots.

Its name is a mondegreen: "Partially Clips" sounds similar to "Partial eclipse".

== Distribution and reception ==
PartiallyClips was updated twice weekly, on Sundays and Thursdays. The partiallyclips.com website stopped updating on 17 June 2015. During 2018, the PartiallyClips website went down and as of July 2023 remains unavailable. The archives were available on the Erfworld domain, but are no longer available after that domain has largely been taken down due to personal tragedy.

In addition to its online audience, the strip was also self-syndicated to print, targeted at alternative weekly newspapers. It appeared in roughly 25 newspapers and magazines, and was published in a book, Suffering For My Clip Art: The Best Of Partially Clips Volume 1. Material from PartiallyClips was included in Attitude 3: The New Subversive Online Cartoonists.

PartiallyClips was included in a 2009 short list of webcomics included in an NPR article. The article's author, Glen Weldon, described it as "a combination of found art, a finely honed comic sensibility, and awesomeness run rampant."

== See also ==
- Dinosaur Comics, another constrained comic
- Erfworld, another comic by Balder started in 2006
