= Dumbing of Age =

Dramatic webcomic by David Willis

- The first four panels of Dumbing of Age.
- Author: David Willis
- Website: dumbingofage.com
- Current status/schedule: Updates daily
- Launch date: September 10, 2010
- Genres: Drama; Slice of life; Comedy

Dumbing of Age is a webcomic about college life at Indiana University by cartoonist David Willis with themes involving drama or comedy, occasionally with a mixture of both. The series itself is a reboot reusing characters from Willis' previous comics (Roomies!, It's Walky!, Joyce and Walky!, and Shortpacked!). While Willis' previous webcomics shared a science-fiction universe, Dumbing of Age is independent of these, reflecting more slice-of-life than the previous works. The comic is generally set in the present day, yet not set in any particular year due to the glacial pacing (Every in-universe day takes around 1-2 months of daily comics), current technologies are depicted in-comic anachronistically so the comic is not a period piece. Willis has reported Dumbing of Age to be his most popular webcomic, with a readership around three times that of Shortpacked!.

== Plot and themes ==
The story follows a large ensemble cast, most of which are Indiana University first-years living in the same co-ed dorm. There are themes of parental abuse, depression, attempted suicide, sexual assault, and some instance of homophobia and transphobia.

== Characters ==
- Joyce Brown is a home-schooled Christian girl who is outgoing and cheerful, and her best friend is an atheist girl named Dorothy, while a misanthrope, Sarah, is her roommate.
- Dorothy Keener is very ambitious and an atheist who becomes friends with Joyce. Currently, she shares a dorm room with Becky, while Sierra was a former roommate. She begins the comic dating Danny before quickly breaking things off. Walky and she also dated for a while.
- Amber O'Malley comes from a disruptive home life with an abusive father, growing up with Ethan, her best friend, dating him until he came out as gay at her prom prior to the beginning of the web-comic. Joe becomes her stepbrother following their parents' marriage. A traumatic event causes her to manifest a second personality, "Amazi-Girl", who operates as a vigilante and starts dating Danny at one point. She has been described as "superhero in an otherwise normal setting."
- Sal Walkerton is Walky's sister. She is largely disliked and distrusted by her parents, due to her behavioral problems as a child, notably including holding up a convenience store. As a result, she was sent to a Catholic boarding school, finding smoking, tattoos, and motorcycles there, instead of what her parents expected, leading her to become more rebellious. Originally her roommate is Billie, before Billie's sexual liaison with Ruth results in Billie leaving the floor. Malaya becomes her replacement roommate, though the two don't get along, and didn't prior to the move.
- David "Walky" Walkerton is a favorite child of his parents, due to his tendency to get good grades. He embraces the university as a place with no structure, parents, or order. He is also the twin brother of Sal, is the boyfriend of Lucy, and is ignored by Billie. He is also Dorothy and Amber's ex-boyfriend.
- Becky MacIntyre is a close friend of Joyce who went to a Christian university at first because her father thought a secular institution would "corrupt" her mind. She is pulled out by her father due to having been discovered making out with her roommate, the start of a chain of events that eventually culminated in the death of her and Amber's respective fathers and Mike. She would then officially move to Indiana University on a scholarship funded by Robin. Presently she is dating Dina and is Dorothy's roommate. She is a lesbian
- Jennifer "Billie" Billingsworth was once the head of the cheerleader squad at her high school and prom queen, but now she is an alcoholic. She was the roommate of Sal, before her sexual liaison with Ruth resulted in her being moved to another residence, where she is roomed with Lucy. She had a relationship with her R.A., Ruth, and was in a relationship with Asher.
- Ruth Lessick is a resident assistant who rules her floor with an iron fist and sometimes fights with Billie, who she hates. She and Billie dated for a while, and she is now involved somewhat with Jason.
- Danny Wilcox is an idealistic, romantic, and trusting person, and Joe as his best friend, who is his roommate. On the first day of college, Dorothy, his girlfriend from high school, dumped him, and he hasn't had luck at getting a boyfriend or girlfriend since, though he had a brief relationship with Amazi-Girl.
- Sarah Clinton is a sophomore misanthrope who likes to study and isn't very social with other people, who ratted out her roommate, Dana, during her first year due to Dana's drug use and unhealthy mental state, leading her to become a social pariah.
- Dina Saruyama is a small and quiet person who prefers observation to conversation, though she is loves talking about science, especially dinosaurs. She is the roommate of Amber, and the Becky's girlfriend.
- Ethan Siegal is a gay man who is dashing, understanding, protective, and selfless, coming out to his girlfriend, and best friend, Amber, at his high school prom. He is the roommate of Jacob and bonds with Joyce over Transformers cartoons.
- Mike Warner was Walky's first roommate and a childhood friend of Ethan and Amber, who enjoyed annoying others and picking at their insecurities. He was killed during the first semester while fending off Amber and Becky's fathers.
- Joe Rosenthal is the best friend and roommate of Danny, and goes on a failed date with Joyce early on, before eventually dating her. Thanks to their parents marriage, he is now also Amber's step-brother, and it's hinted he has a protective crush on Joyce these days.
- Carla Rutten, who lives in a single room, wants people to acknowledge her and seems to style herself after a cartoon character she liked from her childhood. She is also trans and asexual.
- Leslie Bean is a gender studies teacher who is not good with relationships, and who is a mentor to Becky. Leslie used to be a homeless lesbian and has issues with her parents.
- Jacob Williams is a gorgeous man who is friendly, outgoing, and doesn't like being distracted from his studying. He is the roommate of Ethan, and an object of lust from Sarah.
- Robin DeSanto is a former Congressional Representative who lost her reelection by flirting with Leslie. She is currently a professor who wears a bow tie in hopes of attracting Leslie's attention.
- Malaya Eugenio is a person who uses any pronouns and realizes they "transcend gender." The gender, if they had to name it, would be "hot." Malaya is Sal's roommate but both do not get along.
- Lucy Glenn is a cheerful person with good intentions who was formerly Malaya's roommate but is now Billie's roommate. She has unrequited feelings for Walky and both are close friends.
- Roz DeSanto is Robin's little sister who shouts her progressive beliefs whenever she can, even broadcasting them on Boobtube, the comic's version of YouTube.
- Booster Sanchez is the roommate of Walky, has a twin sister, and likes photography. They are currently studying psychology for their major and are new to the college.

== Publication ==
David Willis announced at AnimeFest 2010 that his newest project is titled Dumbing of Age, a return to the setting of the original Roomies! comic, Indiana University, with both old characters from Roomies!, It's Walky!, and Shortpacked! as well as new characters created for Dumbing of Age. Writer and researcher Sean Kleefeld later noted that Willis set the comic in college so he could "work out his personal demons" and to connect with a bigger audience, even though, as Kleefeld puts it, "the characters remained fundamentally the same."

On September 18, 2020, Willis announced that he would be drawing a Patreon-only comic based on the in-universe Dexter and the Monkey Master comics.

== Influences ==
In an interview with The Mary Sue, Willis said that he based Joyce and her family on his own upbringing, with his parents reading the "early 1980s equivalent of Fox News," removing everything that she thought would "corrupt" him, like Scooby-Doo, Disney's Adventures of the Gummi Bears, Care Bears, Mister Rogers' Neighborhood, and The Simpsons, with his family attending a "nondenominational fundamentalist Protestant church." Apart from that, he stated that he passively listened to others, following "wonderful people" on Tumblr, Twitter, and Facebook, hearing what they have to say, and trying to find empathy with others, even if he makes himself "a little uncomfortable" and confronts his white privilege, even revising "false information" at times.

== Reception ==
The comic has been received somewhat positively. Some said that the "sharp changes between humour and seriousness" are a trademark for the comic, while others have called it interesting and enjoyable, even if it is a source of frustration to see "characters in a different setting." Maggie Vicknair of Comics Beat stated while it would not be possible to accurately summarize every plot moment in the comic, each chapter "revolves around one day and jumps between different characters’ adjacent plot lines," with stories range in their subject and tone, even as they are all in the same universe, along with many "interconnected romance plots." Tom Speelman of ComicsAlliance called it one of "the best original ongoing comics being published today," with the characters learning about "life's ups and downs and that adulthood isn't easy," and called it Willis' magnum opus, saying it has "emotionally true storytelling." He further said that the comic has a "crack sense of humor" and said that anyone coming into college, in college, or in high school should read it, along with those who like his previous works or other webcomics like Questionable Content, Girls With Slingshots or R. K. Milholland's Something Positive.
