= Connecticut Convention Center =

Convention center in Hartford, Connecticut, US

Coordinates: 41°45′44″N 72°40′6″W

- Interactive map of Connecticut Convention Center
- Address: 100 Columbus Boulevard; Hartford, Connecticut 06103
- Owner: Capital Region Development Authority
- Public transit: 30, Dash

Construction
- Opened: June 2005

Website
- www.ctconventions.com

The Connecticut Convention Center is a convention center located in downtown Hartford, Connecticut, United States, overlooking the Connecticut River.

== History ==
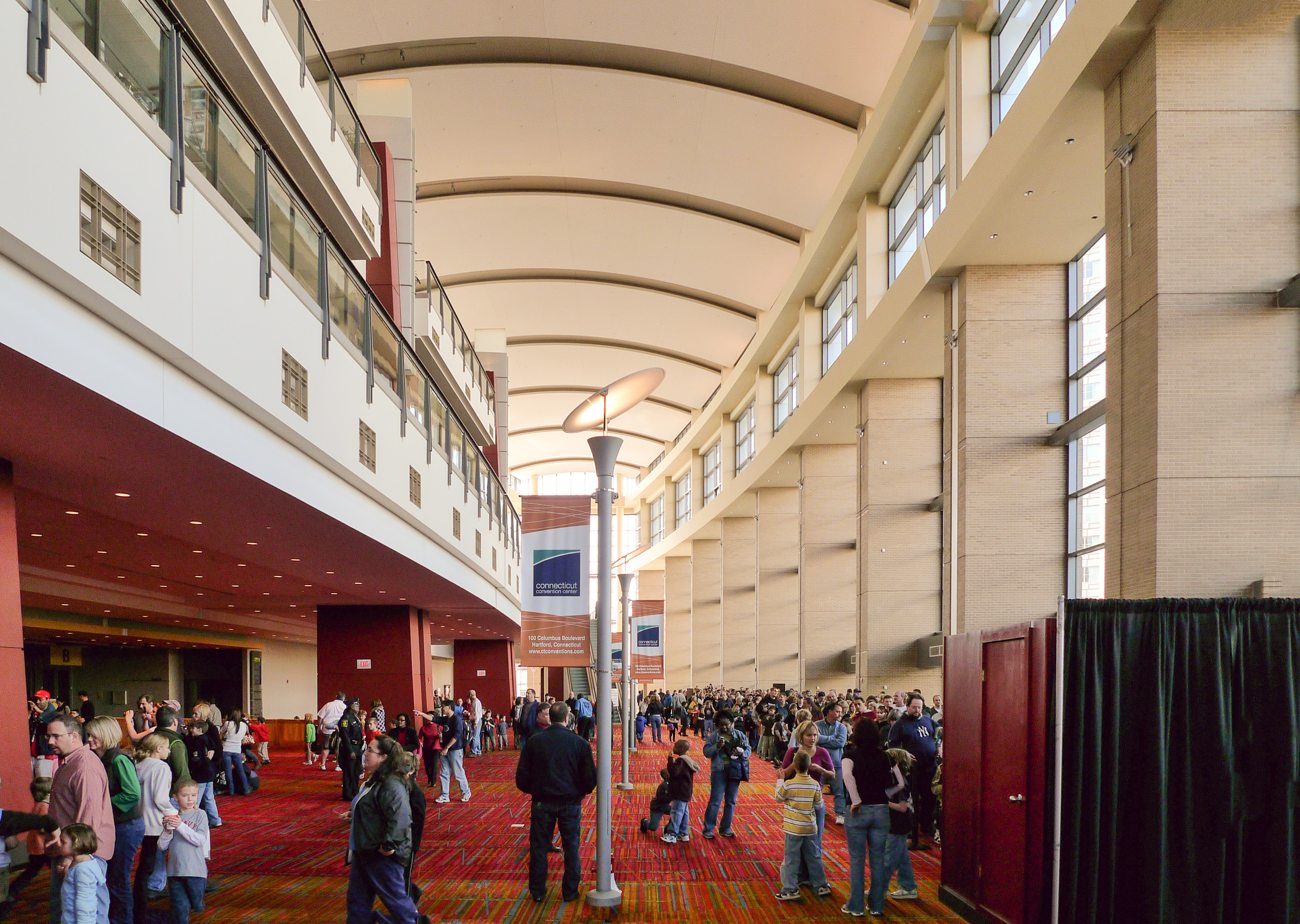
Connecticut Convention Center in 2009

The center opened on June 2, 2005. It was designed by Thompson, Ventulett, Stainback & Associates and features more than 140,000 square feet (13,000 m^{2}) of exhibition space, a 40,000-square-foot (4,000 m^{2}) ballroom and 25,000 square feet (2,300 m^{2}) of flexible meeting space. It is the largest convention facility between New York and Boston. The Connecticut Convention Center’s 110-foot (34 m) glass atrium rises ten stories above a grand public plaza and a tree-lined riverfront esplanade.

The Connecticut Convention Center has been home to ConnectiCon since 2005.

== See also ==
- List of convention centers in the United States
