= Raymond and Scum =

- Origin: Los Angeles, California, USA
- Genres: Comedy rock
- Years active: 1992–present
- Labels: INOU Records
- Members: Matthew Dunn; Jeff Smith
- Website: Official website

== The Background ==
Raymond and Scum is a comedy rock band based in Southern California. Vocalist Jeff Smith and guitarist Matthew Dunn formed the band while they were still in high school. Their songs were regularly played on the syndicated Dr. Demento Show. The duo regularly compose and sing songs about celebrities. Demi Moore, Jeff Goldblum, Jennifer Lopez and Aerosmith have all been subjects of their songs.

To date, they have three CDs, 2003's Touch It, 2005's Suck, and the 2014 greatest hits album "Take It All", as well as appearances on comedy music compilation CDs such as both volumes of Laughter Is A Powerful Weapon and Technobabble. Other comedy musicians have also appeared on Raymond and Scum albums, such as Worm Quartet and Sudden Death. "Weird Al" Yankovic's drummer, Jon "Bermuda" Schwartz, also played drums on two tracks of Suck.

In 2007, R&S joined the great Luke Ski, Tom Smith, and Rob Balder to form The FuMP (The Funny Music Project), a web site providing free comedy music downloads every Tuesday and Friday.

== Discography ==
=== Studio albums ===
- Touch It (2003)
- Suck (2005)
- Take It All (2014)

=== Downloadable singles ===
- "Nothing's Gonna Tear Us Apart (Love Theme from Stupid Teenagers Must Die!)" (2006)

=== Compilations ===
- The Best Of The All-U-Can-Eat Buffet Of Musical Madness Vol. 1 (1998)
- The Best Of The B.O.R.E.D. Tour Vol. 1 (1999)
- The Best Of The All-U-Can-Eat Buffet Of Musical Madness Vol. 2 (2000)
- Laughter Is A Powerful Weapon: Funny Musicians For A Serious Cause (2002)
- The Crazy Jay Show presents White Trash Comedy (2003)
- Dr. Demento's Basement Tapes 12 (2003)
- Mr. Snail's Halloween Party (2005)
- Laughter Is A Powerful Weapon Vol. 2 (2005)
- Technobabble (2006)
- The FuMP Volume 1 (2007)
- The FuMP Volume 2 (2007)
- The FuMP Volume 3 (2007)
- The FuMP Volume 4 (2007)
- The FuMP Volume 5 (2007)
- The FuMP Volume 6 (2007)
- The FuMP Volume 7 (2008)
- The FuMP Volume 9 (2008)
- The FuMP Volume 10 (2008)
- The FuMP Volume 11 (2008)
- The FuMP Volume 14 (2009)
- The FuMP Volume 17 (2009)
- The FuMP Volume 19 (2010)

=== Guest appearances ===
- Hot Waffles: Ready To Laugh? We Don't Care (2005)
- The Radio Adventures Of Dr. Floyd - The Complete Season 3 (2006)

=== Out-of-print CDs ===
- Til Someone Loses An Eye: The Safety Tips Compilation (1999)
- Raymond and Scum: Almost EP (1999)
- The Crazy Jay Show Featured Artists Vol. 1 (2000)

=== Other appearances ===
- Raymond and Scum performed "Nothing's Gonna Tear Us Apart (Love Theme From Stupid Teenagers Must Die!)" for the end credits of the indie horror/comedy flick directed by vocalist Jeff Smith, Stupid Teenagers Must Die!.
- Matthew and Jeff portrayed Lewis and Clark on The Radio Adventures of Dr. Floyd.
