= Metroland (newspaper) =

Defunct newspaper in Albany, New York

- Type: Alternative weekly
- Format: Tabloid
- Owner(s): Lou Communications, Inc.
- Publisher: Stephen Leon
- Editor: Stephen Leon
- Founded: 1978
- Language: English
- Headquarters: 279 Washington Ave. Albany, NY 12210; United States
- Circulation: 40,000
- Website: metroland.net

Metroland was an alternative newspaper that was published weekly in Albany, New York and mainly served the Capital District area. Distributed free of charge, the paper offered local arts and music scene coverage, news and feature articles, and political columns with a mostly liberal bent. It billed itself as "The Capital Region's Alternative Newsweekly".

Every week, Metroland included an opinion column, several local news stories, a cover story, and a comprehensive calendar of events (with a movie clock). In addition, it had published reviews of movies, restaurants, concerts, recordings, art exhibitions, dance performances, and plays. Metroland columnists include Paul Rapp, Miriam Axel-Lute, and Jo Page. Regular syndicated features include This Modern World, Savage Love, Partially Clips, Slowpoke, and Free Will Astrology. The paper also published special features such as "Best of the Capital Region", Readers Poll, fashion issues, dining guides, and "Inside Saratoga".

Metroland was edited and published by Stephen Leon and was founded in 1978 by Peter Iselin. The newspaper was published by Lou Communications, Inc. and is a member of the Association of Alternative Newsweeklies.

On November 3, 2015, the New York State Department of Taxation and Finance seized its 279 Washington Avenue offices for unpaid back taxes of over $20,000. Since then, Metroland has ceased publication.

== Successor publications ==
On November 22, 2016, an alternative weekly named The Alt launched out of Schenectady, a partnership between the daily newspaper The Daily Gazette, arts organization Proctors, and advertising agency Overit, staffed by former Metroland editor David Howard King and Aly Medina, who had been an account executive at Metroland. The Daily Gazette put up $500,000 in funding. The Alt ceased publication in September 2018, relaunching as an arts magazine called The Collaborative. The Collaborative stopped putting out a print edition in 2020 during the COVID-19 pandemic, and ceased publication in 2021.

In October 2024, a publication inspired by Metroland named Metroland Now launched covering arts and entertainment.
