= Jamie Noguchi =

American cartoonist

- Areas: Penciller, Artist, Inker, Colourist

Jamie Noguchi is a Japanese/Chinese-American artist and webcomic author who used to publish Yellow Peril, an Asian-American office romance comedy webcomic, and Sherlock Holmes' Seriously Short Mini Mysteries, with Steve Napierski. The first Yellow Peril compilation, Back to the Grind: A Yellow Peril Collection, was published in 2011 and the second, The Client is Always: A Yellow Peril Collection, was published in 2013. Noguchi was also the first in the series of illustrators for the Erfworld webcomic. During his time as illustrator, it was listed as one of Time magazine's "Top 10 Graphic Novels of 2007".

Separately, Noguchi is a co-founder of Super Art Fight, a show based in Baltimore, Maryland, where notable artists engage in a real-time artistic competition incorporating various design elements over the course of 30 minutes, occasionally opting to interact with each other's art in a battle, with audience participation determining the winner.

Noguchi's work has also appeared on The Nib and Vox.

== Published works ==
List of graphic novels republishing Noguchi's work
| No. | Title | Release date | ISBN |
|---|---|---|---|
| 1 | Iron Man by Mike Grell: The Complete Collection | May 26, 2021 | 978-1-302-92677-9 |
"In Shining Iron Part 1 of 3" (colorist)

List of School for Extraterrestrial Girls graphic novels
| No. | Title | Release date | ISBN |
|---|---|---|---|
| 2 | Girls in Flight | November 28, 2023 | 978-1545806968 |
| 1 | Girl on Fire | August 4, 2020 | 978-1545804926 |

List of New Frontiers graphic novels
| No. | Title | Release date | ISBN |
|---|---|---|---|
| 1 | New Frontiers: The Many Worlds of George Takei | 2017 | 9780692913222 |
"Excelsior"

List of Yellow Peril graphic novels
| No. | Title | Release date | ISBN |
|---|---|---|---|
| 2 | The Client Is Always | July 17, 2013 | 978-0-9836403-1-8 |
| 1 | Back to the Grind | August 23, 2011 | 978-0-9836403-0-1 |

List of Secret Identities graphic novels
| No. | Title | Release date | ISBN |
|---|---|---|---|
| 1 | Shattered: The Asian American Comics Anthology | November 6, 2012 | 978-1595588241 |
"Master Tortoise & Master Hare"

List of Erfworld graphic novels
| No. | Title | Release date | ISBN |
|---|---|---|---|
| 1 | The Battle for Gobwin Knob | January 1, 2012 | 978-0983137832 |

=== Comic Books ===
The Grand Comics Database has a list of comic books Jamie has worked as a colorist on at this external link. The exceptions are ThunderCats / Battle of the Planets #1, where he worked as a penciller, Shattered, a graphic novel anthology in which he was the artist for one of the chapters, and School for Extraterrestial Girls, a comic in which he was the penciller, inker, and colorist.

=== Collectible cards ===
Jamie Noguchi drew the following cards for the Ultraman Card Game, launched in Summer 2024 by Tsuburaya Productions:

- Ultraman Dyna: Flash Type
- Ultraman Orb
- Dark Lugiel
- Ultraman Omega
- Ultraman X
- Ultraman X: Xanadium Beam
- Ultraman Victory: EX Red King Knuckle

== Music ==
Noguchi has released 7 singles, including "Shit Mother Fucker, Goddamn."
