= Megan Mackie =

Fantasy writer

Megan Mackie is a genre-bending fantasy writer. She has written several series including The Lucky Devil Series, The Saint Code Series, Dead World, Working Mask, Silverblooded Scion, The Adventures of Pavlov's Dog and Schrödinger's Cat, and Advanced Con Quest.

== Early life and education ==
Megan Mackie graduated from the Cortiva Institute and began working in the massage therapy field in 2010 at the Balanced Body Integrated Wellness in Chicago's Logan Square neighborhood. She continued to work as a clinical massage therapist after becoming an author.

Mackie wrote a play called "The Princess Peach Conspiracy", inspired by the Mario video game series, and performed at the New Millennium Theatre Company in 2014 in Chicago. She later ran a satirical podcast also called the "Princess Peach Conspiracy"

She was a guest at the Pop! Con in Franklin Park, Illinois in 2017 and 2019, and she helped run the Bad Grammar Theater booth at Capricon in 2020.

== Personal life ==
When Megan isn't writing, she likes to play board games, puzzle boxes, RPGs, and video games. She lives in Chicago with her husband and children, two dogs, two cats, and her mother in the apartment upstairs. She has become a personality at many comic conventions, recognizable by her iconic leather hat and smile.

== Career ==
Megan Mackie self-published The Finder of the Lucky Devil, the first novel in her Lucky Devil series. She is the author of The Lucky Devil Series (urban fantasy/cyberpunk), the Dead World Series (Post Post Zombie Apocalypse), The Adventures of Pavlov’s Dog and Schrodinger’s Cat (Mid-grade science fiction) and the Working Mask series (wannabe superhero). Her other work can be found on the Yonder app, where she has published three web novels, Cookbooks and Demons (paranormal demon romance), Star Courier (speculative Firefly-like fiction), and Novantis (steampunk political intrigue with sky pirates—think Bridgerton meets Black Sails).

Outside of her own series, she is a contributing writer for the RPGs Legendlore and Legendlore: Legacies by Onyx Path.

The Lucky Devil Series - Urban fantasy/Cyberpunk

No.	Title	Paperback Release Date	Paperback ISBN	Ebook Release Date	Ebook ASIN	Audio release date	Audio CD ISBN	Audio Length
1	The Finder of the Lucky Devil	January 16, 2023	979-8823201001	January 16, 2023	B0BS5GHMK7	March 9, 2023	B0BRYR4ZBC	13 hours and 51 minutes
2	The Saint of Liars	June 3, 2018	978-0692115879	December 21, 2023	B0CQS69V5T	August 23, 2022	B0BBPLLDQY	15 hours and 29 minutes
3	The Devil's Day	February 3, 2023	979-8823201063	December 22, 2023	B0CQV8X1NS			
4	The Digital Mage			March 5, 2024	B0CQQL5TFJ			
5	Death and the Crone	February 10, 2023	978-1644507155					

The Saint Code Series - Urban fantasy/Cyberpunk

No.	Title	Paperback Release Date	Paperback ISBN	Ebook Release Date	Ebook ASIN	Audio release date	Audio CD ISBN	Audio Length
1	The Lost			December 23, 2023	B0CQW9VCYG			
2	The Constable							

Working Mask - YA Superhero/Supervillain

No.	Title	Paperback Release Date	Paperback ISBN	Ebook Release Date	Ebook ASIN	Audio release date	Audio CD ISBN	Audio Length
1	The Vilification of Aqua Marine	December 26, 2023	979-8823201797	December 26, 2023	B0CLVSQXFK			

Dead World - Zombie Apocalypse

No.	Title	Paperback Release Date	Paperback ISBN	Ebook Release Date	Ebook ASIN	Audio release date	Audio CD ISBN	Audio Length
1	The Prisoner of the Dead	February 28, 2022	979-8422037377	February 28, 2022	B09TN1GHDL	November 5, 2023	B0CL59SQJK	15 hours and 46 minutes

Silverblood Series - Epic fantasy

No.	Title	Paperback Release Date	Paperback ISBN	Ebook Release Date	Ebook ASIN	Audio release date	Audio CD ISBN	Audio Length
1	Silverblooded Scion	978-1644509050	December 27, 2023	December 27, 2023	B0CLW8QVDW			

The Adventures of Pavlov's Dog and Schrodinger's Cat - Midgrade Science Fiction

No.	Title	Paperback Release Date	Paperback ISBN	Ebook Release Date	Ebook ASIN	Audio release date	Audio CD ISBN	Audio Length
1	Maxwell's Demon	April 1, 2023	978-1644507285					

Advanced Con Quest: The Art of Selling at Cons

No.	Title	Paperback Release Date	Paperback ISBN	Ebook Release Date	Ebook ASIN	Audio release date	Audio CD ISBN	Audio Length
1	Advanced Con Quest	January 19, 2023	979-8823200547	January 19, 2023	B0BS5FY8PP			
