= Carlos Ferro (American actor) =

American actor

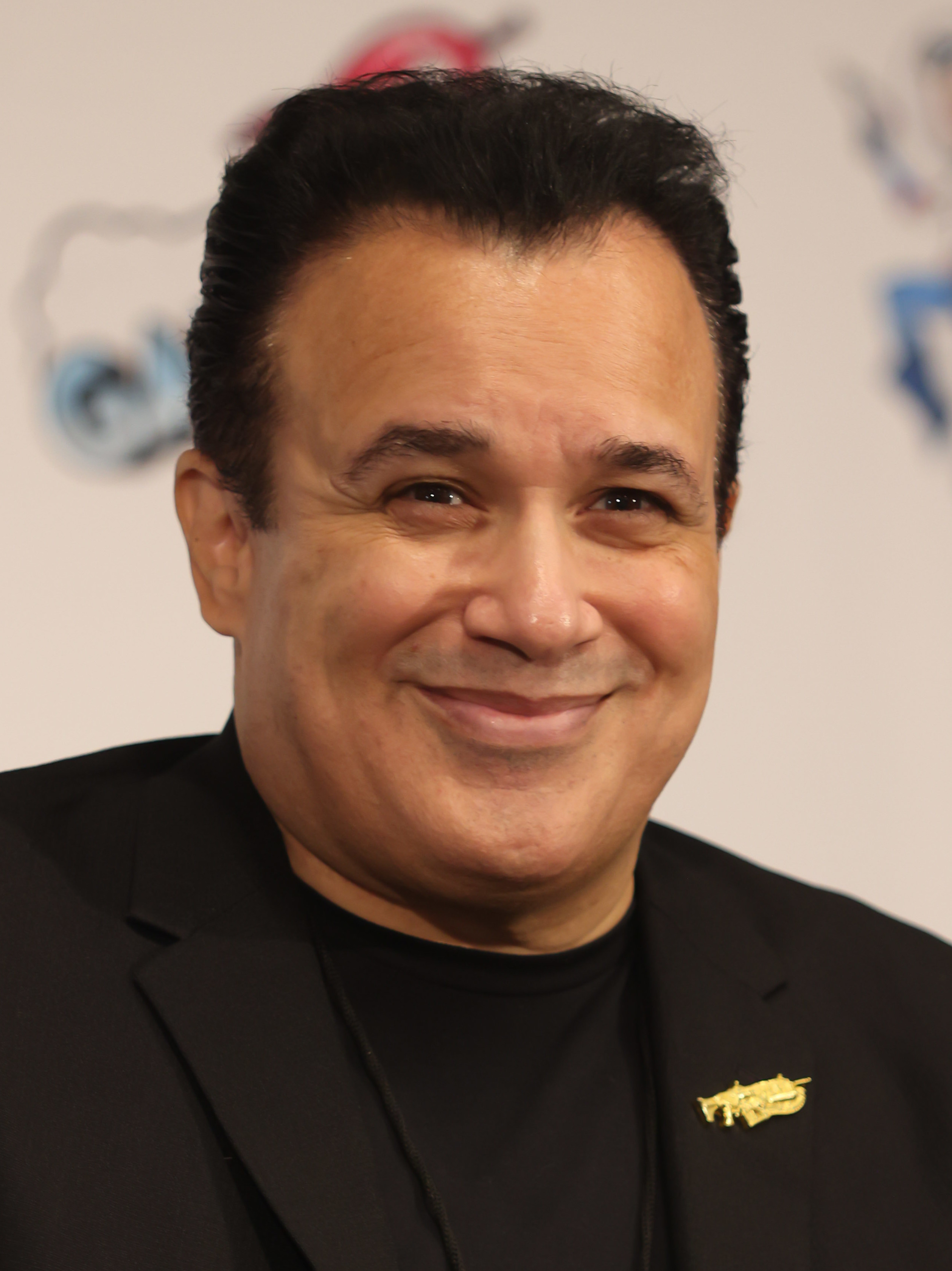
- Ferro at GalaxyCon Raleigh in 2021
- Occupations: Actor; screenwriter; director; producer
- Years active: 1983–present

Carlos Ferro is an American actor, screenwriter, director, and producer.

== Early life ==
Ferro's first career in the entertainment industry was as a DJ. Leaving music for a career in theatre and television, his work eventually led to a stint as an artist in residence at Cornell University.

== Performance ==
Ferro's starred in the show SAL, originally produced at the Climate Theatre in San Francisco then at the Zephyr Theatre in Hollywood. His portrayal of Sal Mineo, co-produced and co-written by him, received a Bay Area Theatre Critics Circle Award nomination for Best Solo Performance.

Since then, he has continued acting in television, both in live-action and animation. He has worked with director John Landis and actors Jerry Lewis, Harvey Fierstein, and Dudley Moore.

== Filmography ==
=== Television ===
Year	Title	Role	Notes
1995	Santo Bugito	Pedro, Biker Bug	Episode: "Buenos Roaches"
1997	Spicy City	Paco	Episode: "Mano's Hands"
1998–1999	Todd McFarlane's Spawn	Jesus, Cop, Guerilla	2 episodes
2001	Static Shock	Effects Technician	Episode: "Bent out of Shape"
2003	Justice League	Radocko	Episode: "Hearts and Minds"
2014	Beware the Batman	Police Commissioner	Episode: "Darkness"

=== Film ===
Year	Title	Role	Notes
2010	Assassin's Creed: Ascendance	Leonardo da Vinci	Short film
2012	Big Top Scooby-Doo!	Oliverio, Sisko	Direct-to-video

=== Video games ===
Year	Title	Role
2002	X-Men: Next Dimension	Forge
2003	James Bond 007: Everything or Nothing	South American Guard
2004	Xenosaga Episode II: Jenseits von Gut und Böse	Knights of Ormus, additional voices
2005	Tony Hawk's American Wasteland	Cholo, Tool Pusher
2006	Saints Row	Manuel Orejuela
2006	Gears of War	Dominic Santiago
2007	Assassin's Creed	Damascus Bureau Leader
2007	Uncharted: Drake's Fortune	Mercenaries
2008	Saints Row 2	Phil, Mascot, Construction Worker
2008	Gears of War 2	Dominic Santiago
2008	Quantum of Solace	Spanish Mercenaries
2009	Indiana Jones and the Staff of Kings	Pillagers
2009	The Godfather II	Michael Corleone
2009	Assassin's Creed II	Leonardo da Vinci
2010	Command & Conquer: Tiberian Twilight	Mastodon
2010	Assassin's Creed: Brotherhood	Leonardo da Vinci
2011	Rango	Señor Flan
2011	Gears of War 3	Dominic Santiago
2011	Uncharted 3: Drake's Deception	Mercenaries
2012	Starhawk	Rifters
2013	Lightning Returns: Final Fantasy XIII	Various voices
2015	Battlefield Hardline	Additional Voices
2016	Gears of War 4	Dominic Santiago
2019	Gears 5	Dominic Santiago
2019	Shenmue III	Various voices
2023	Assassin's Creed Nexus VR	Leonardo da Vinci
2026	Gears of War: E-Day	Dominic Santiago

== Music video production ==
In 2005, Ferro made his foray into the world of music videos, producing and directing musical artist Stoomie's "Two For a Tenner – Yes Please (Melrose Edit)."
