= Erfworld =

Webcomic

- Erfworld Logo
- Author: Rob Balder
- Illustrators: Jamie Noguchi (B1); Xin Ye (B0 & 2-5); David Hahn (B3); Lauri Ahonen (B3); Lillian Chen (B3-5); Connor Cercone (B5); Rob Balder (B5)
- Website: www.erfworld.com
- Current status/schedule: Cancelled
- Launch date: December 7, 2006
- End date: October 1, 2019
- Genre(s): Fantasy, comedy, parody

Erfworld is a story-driven fantasy/comedy webcomic and independently published graphic novel. The series follows Parson, a master strategy gamer summoned into a wargame by a desperate faction desiring a warlord- leaving him trapped in the game. It was written by Rob Balder, who worked with many illustrators over its run. Erfworld began publication in December 2006 on the website Giant in the Playground, better known for hosting The Order of the Stick. It moved to its own website with the completion of Book 1, as had originally been intended, and was highly popular in the early 2010s. It continued until its abrupt cancellation part way through Book 5 in October 2019.

The comic heavily features contemporary memes, pop culture references, and mechanical references to war games. In particular, several characters and motifs are drawn from The Wonderful Wizard of Oz. In juxtaposition to its warlike themes, the visual style is deliberately "cute". The characters resemble dolls or toys and are unable to use profanity. The plot, setting, and characters were released under a Creative Commons Attribution, Noncommercial, ShareAlike license.

== Books ==
Erfworld was divided into "Books" which acted as narrative divisions. Prologue and epilogue pages were usually numbered distinctly and so are represented separately here.

| Vol. | Title | Pagecount | | | Publication period |
| Vol. | Title | Prologue | Body | Epilogue | Publication period |
|---|---|---|---|---|---|
| 0 | Inner Peace (Through Superior Firepower) | - | 81 | - | October 31, 2011 - October 29, 2013 |
| 1 | The Battle for Gobwin Knob | - | 150 | 21 | December 7, 2006 - May 22, 2009 |
| 2 | Love is a Battlefield | 28 | 114 | 25 | October 2009 - December 3, 2013 |
| 3 | Hamsterdance versus the Charlie Foxtrot | - | 145 (Note: Much of Book 4 was originally marked as additional pages of Book 3 before being separated out.) | - | August 16, 2014 - March 26, 2016 |
| 4 | Lies and Dolls | 9 | 190 (Note: Lies and Dolls, unlike other books, includes the prologue pages in its numbering for the main body- meaning the final page of the body is marked 199 rather than 190.) | 4 | March 28, 2016 - November 2, 2018 |
| 5 | Temple Tantrum | 35 | Unpublished | | November 9, 2018 - October 1, 2019 |

== Staff ==
- Rob Balder, writer for all material and illustrator for portions of Book 5.
- Jamie Noguchi, illustrator for Book 1.
- Xin Ye, illustrator for Book 0 and 2-5.
- David Hahn, illustrator for Book 2 epilogues and early Book 3.
- Arthur Chu, voice actor for animated versions of Book 2 epilogues.
- Lauri Ahonen, inks and colors for Book 3.
- Lillian Chen, inks and colors for Book 3-5.
- Connor Cercone, 3D modelling for portions of Book 5.

== Plot ==
=== Book 0: Inner Peace (Through Superior Firepower) ===
The prequel follows two warlords- the croakamancer Wanda and Princess Jillian of Faq, who both struggle in their own ways against the might of Haffaton, a vast empire. Wanda's side Goodminton is defeated, and Olive Branch of Haffaton manipulates her into defecting. Jillian is captured by Haffaton, and taken to Efbaum, the Emerald City. The ruler of Haffaton, Judy, uses the Arkenshoes to return to her own world. In a swift maneouver, Jillian and the others from Faq are able to snipe the near-abandoned capital and assassinate Branch. The move dissolves Haffaton- and a deal with the Wizard Charlescomm heals Wanda, at the cost of razing the city.

=== Book 1: The Battle for Gobwin Knob ===
The strategy gamer Parson Gotti is summoned from Earth into Erfworld, to be the "perfect warlord" under Lord Stanley, who faces a doomed defense of his last city. Parson orchestrates the defense using his knowledge of tabletop strategy games. As Erfworld is governed by game-like rules he is extremely skilled at this and is aided by his calculator watch which the locals consider a powerful magic item. Jillian and Wanda find themselves on opposing sides in this conflict, with Wanda deploying uncroaked units in defence of the city, Jillian aiding Prince Ansom in his siege, and Charlescomm extracting payment for intermittent aid to either side. As a last resort Parson activates the volcano beneath the city to kill their foes, which achieves a technical victory. Wanda gains control of Ansom's Arkenpliers and "decrypts" the invading army, which is then resurrected and under her command. This includes Lillith, one of Charlie's archons, and Ansom himself.

=== Book 2: Love is a Battlefield ===
Wanda's control of the Arkenpliers allows Gobwin Knob to expand and capture many cities, striking back against the coalition that had sieged their capital. After the fall of Unaroyal, Wanda lays siege to Spacerock, the capital of Jetstone and Ansom's family home. Jillian, now queen of a refounded Faq, captures Ansom and leaves the battle. Parson is initially only guiding the attack from the rear, but attempts to transit through the Magic Kingdom's portals against convention to reach the city quickly and salvage their attack. This causes a dispute with the magicians there and leads Parson to realise that he was summoned not just to defend Gobwin Knob but to defeat Charlescomm. Parson learns of how Charlie summoned Judy to Erfworld to defeat the Wicked Witch of the West and seize the Arkendish. He is aware of The Wonderful Wizard of Oz and recognises Charlie as the Wizard. Spacerock falls, though Jetstone are able to capture Lillith and get her out of the city. Parson is forced to occupy the Magic Kingdom.

=== Book 3: Hamsterdance versus the Charlie Foxtrot ===
With Charlescomm’s backing, Jillian attempts a decapitation strike on Gobwin Knob’s largely unprotected core. She is rebuffed by Stanley, loses Ansom, and is forced into retreat. Despite their recent advances, Parson convinces Stanley to engage with diplomacy as being at war with a coalition that includes every neighbouring land is unsustainable. With a truce with Charlie in effect, Parson meets with various factions in the Magic Kingdom, some of which oppose Charlie. Lillith is traded to Charlescomm by Jetstone, and a prison break attempt by her proves expensive for Gobwin Knob as it results in truce violations. She damages the city but makes it back to the Magic Kingdom with several assault rifles, then unknown technology elsewhere in Erfworld. Charlie pursues and the Magic Kingdom becomes a bloodbath. Wanda is captured, and Parson retreats into Transylvito, surrendering to the authorities there.

=== Book 4: Lies and Dolls ===
Parson and his friends face torture in Transylvito, and their captors learn that Jillian is being supported by Charlie. Transylvito sits at the centre of a diplomatic push from both Gobwin Knob and Charlescomm- with their leader Don King debating which group to side with, and determine what contingencies and espionage the two have in play. Jillian manages to capture Gobwin Knob’s original capital with little resistance in Parson and Stanley’s absence- though their seat of power had earlier been moved to Spacerock. Ultimately, Don King is assassinated by his own underling over an internal dispute and his successor Caesar aligns Transylvito with Gobwin Knob. They intervene on behalf of their allies and capture Faq, isolating Jillian. Fighting breaks out in the normally neutral Magic Kingdom when casters attempt to start executing prisoners. Wanda is freed and flees underground, resulting in Minecraft themed attacks from tunneling casters and Charlie’s archons. The towers of each capital develop into sentient “temples” that become involved in side administration. Parson is tricked into using a scroll intended to send him back to Earth, but he is instead teleported to Spacerock. An increasingly frail Charlie attacks and blackmails Transylvito, while Parson and Stanley prepare for another invasion of the Magic Kingdom.

=== Book 5: Temple Tantrum ===
Fumo, a barbarian warlord pops on a remote island. He is picked up by Tidepod and later the Signamancer Noah, of the tiny Nestlý side. They occupy a small island, formerly home to the lost kingdom of Archezoa. The island is a prearranged tropical refuge for Hippiemancers fleeing violence in the Magic Kingdom.

Prior to its cancellation, Balder had described the new characters in the Book 5 prologue as having been set up for a larger, worldwide politics story. The narrative would have later returned to Parson and his companions.

== Publication ==
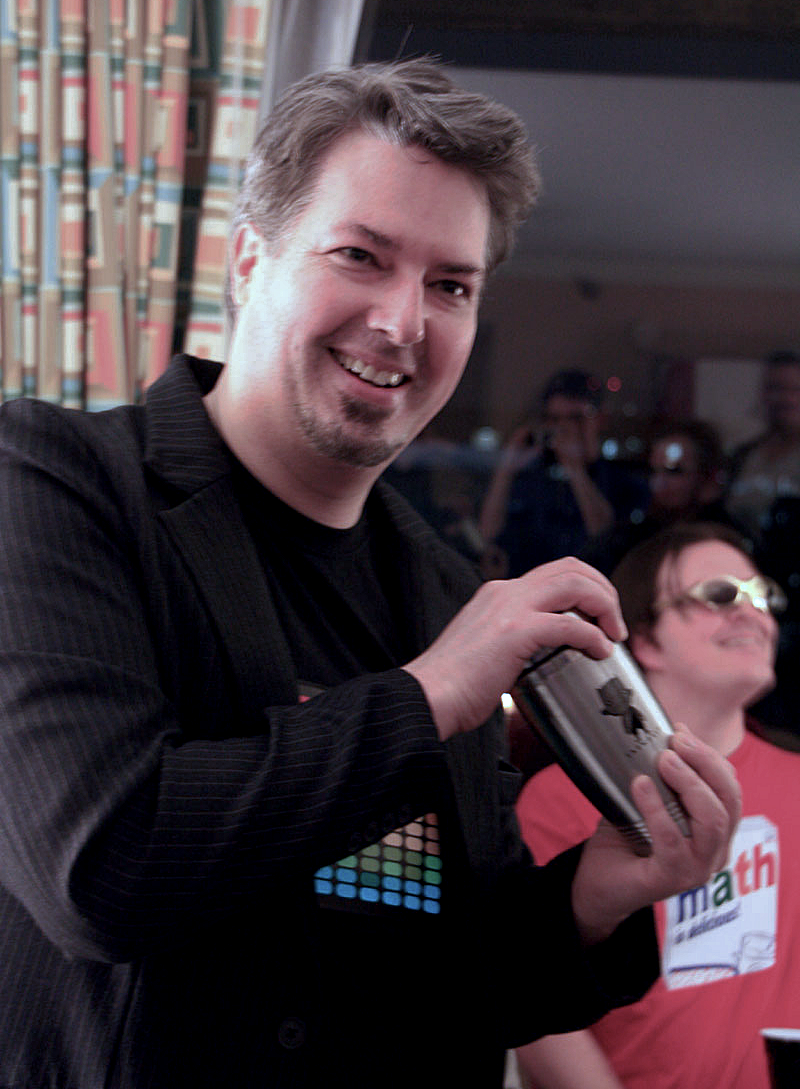
Erfworld's writer, Rob Balder

Erfworld was initially hosted at GiantITP, the platform for the fantasy webcomic The Order of the Stick. As planned, Erfworld moved to its own website after the conclusion of Book 1 on May 22, 2009. The change was announced on GiantITP a few weeks earlier, and Balder and Noguchi released a statement on the day. The dedicated website retained a banner link back to The Order of the Stick in gratitude to Rich Burlew for hosting it originally. Following on the success of the Order of the Stick Kickstarter project, in February 2012, author Rob Balder launched the Erfworld "Year of the Dwagon" Kickstarter, seeking funding for a motion comic project. The Kickstarter was extremely successful, resulting in funding of almost $85,000, making it the fourth-largest comics category Kickstarter project at the time.

Erfworld was an early adopter of crowdfunding, featuring the Toolshed, a Patreon-like funding mechanism that was created specifically for the comic and its site. The website was totally overhauled in May 2016, and a points system rewarded fan contributions. Users could earn "Shmuckers"- Erfworld's currency- which offered store credit. Toolshed members were also rewarded with Shmuckers. Amid advertising issues on the website, Balder adopted crowdsourced fan cryptomining to fund it. This was called "Mine4erf", and was first announced on February 18, 2018. Between the income from Toolbox and cryptomining, they were able to remove all ads from the website that May.

=== Cancellation ===
The comic was facing funding issues in November 2018 due to a number of factors, including a decline in the value of cryptocurrency. Since the removal of ads from the site, cryptomining had been a significant source of income. The comic also moved to a less frequent schedule, due to health issues and other factors. Baldur announced that the comic would take a pause from its normal focus on Parson and his allies, introduce new characters to set up story for Book 5, and increase its reliance on 3D imagery. 3D had been present to a degree since the comic's debut, but for Book 5 he hired Connor Cercone to aid with modeling, and to train the other artists in the discipline. Balder also intended to use the new character introductions in Book 5 to "canonize" character rewards for Kickstarter backers.

In May 2019, Balder announced that Lillian Chen would be leaving the project- though her role would not need to be replaced due to the new 3D imagery angle. In the same news post Rob explained that an undisclosed personal tragedy had occurred and, as a result, Erfworld would not be updating again "for the foreseeable future, possibly the rest of the year." This new event was dubbed Horrible Thing II. Nonetheless, updates did resume later in 2019. The final update was Book 5 prologue page 35, released on October 1, 2019.

On October 11, the website's front page was replaced with an announcement, signed by Rob and Linda Balder, which announced the end of Erfworld as a webcomic as a result of a string of personal tragedies. The Erfworld updates previously published remain available in an online archive, and the website's store remains available. Outside of this, all former functionality of the site was restricted to users with "heartstrings" badges. It also announced that any further updates would only be available to this group of users. A few days later, the original copy of Book 1 was taken down from the GiantITP website.

== Print versions ==
The first two books were made available in print, as hardcover volumes.

| # | Title | Release date | ISBN |
|---|---|---|---|
| 1 | The Battle for Gobwin Knob | March 1, 2011 | 9780983137832 |
| 2 | Love is a Battlefield | June 14, 2014 | 9780983137870 |

Additionally, Love is a Battlefield was also made available as three smaller softcover issues, which collectively cover the full book. These versions contain some bonus material, such as character bios for the Thinkamanacers.

| # | Title | Pages | ISBN |
|---|---|---|---|
| 1 | Meet the Jetstones | 60 | 9780983137801 |
| 2 | It's Raining Men | 80 | 9780983137825 |
| 3 | Lots of Sects, and Violence | 56 | 9780983137863 |

Balder discussed printing books 3 and 4 in November 2018, acknowledging that it was an intention but challenging financially and logistically- creating new art for covers as well as funding the actual print run. It was then earmarked for development in January or February 2019, but did not eventuate.

== Reception ==
Erfworld was recognized as one of the top 10 graphic novels of 2007 by Time magazine and received positive reviews and promotion from webcomics authors, and Time author/journalist Lev Grossman in his articles "Webcomics are the New Blogs" and "Erfworld: It's a Boopin' Good Webcomic!" The addition of Erfworld to GiantITP was noted in "First Watch", Dragon magazine's monthly section on new developments in gaming and entertainment. Additionally, Erfworld was reviewed by Webcomic Overlook, receiving four stars out of five, and was profiled by NPR.
