= Olivia Durant =

American activist

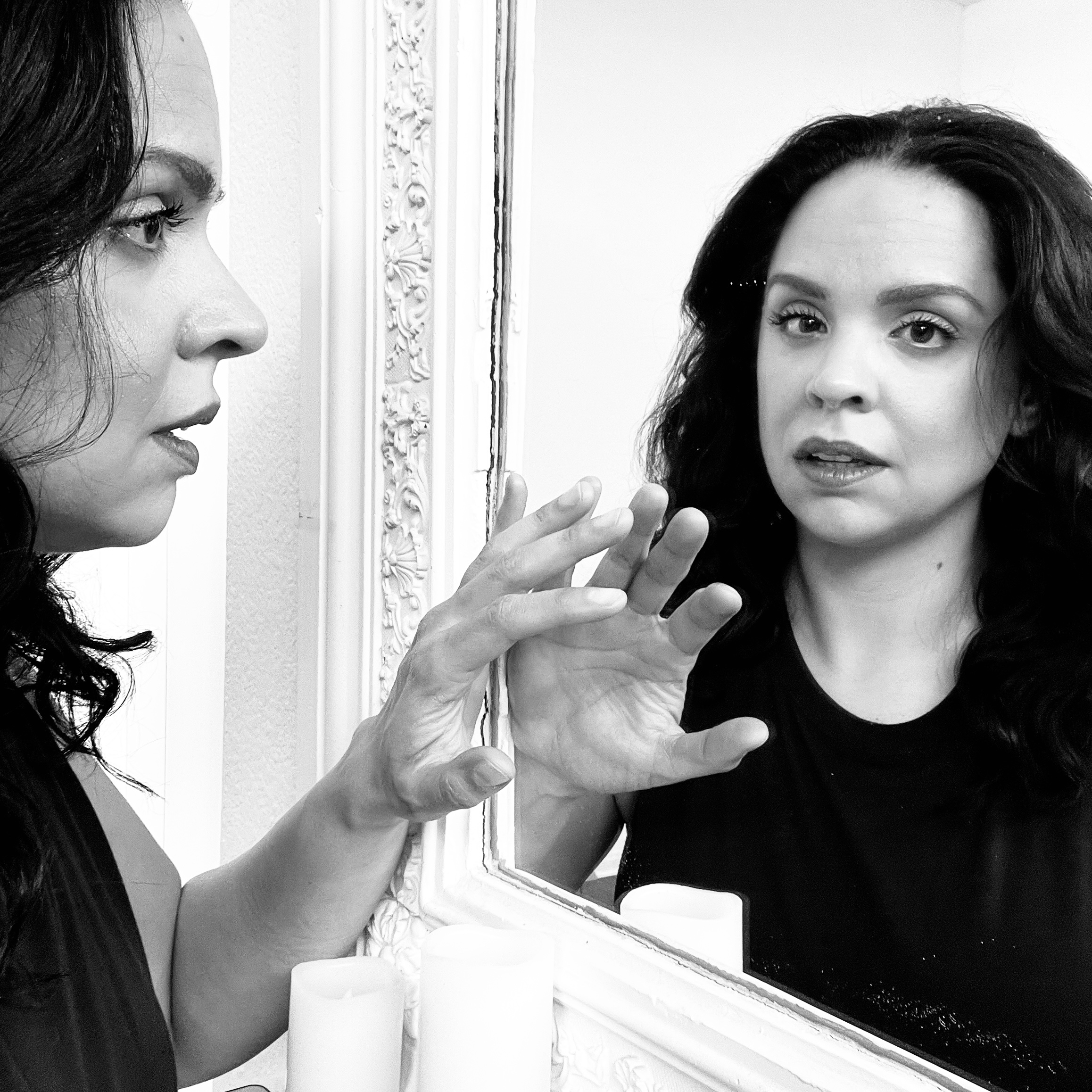
Olivia Durant in 2022

Olivia Durant (formerly known as Karrie Mentzer and Oni Hartstein) is an American activist originally from Pittsburgh, who came to national prominence from being legally blind at birth, then regaining eyesight in 2016 after a surgical procedure at The Eye Center of New York. Durant has been featured on Good Morning America and also been the subject of numerous articles including BuzzFeed and The Insider.

== Early years ==
Olivia Durant has described a visit to an eye doctor when she was a child. According to Durant, the doctor diagnosed her eyes as "weak" and dubbed her legally blind, which is defined as vision worse than 20/200.

Durant was prescribed glasses with two inch thick concave lenses, then corrective contact lenses at age nine that provided a small amount of peripheral vision, albeit blurred. She's described difficulty visually recognizing people and told a story about becoming separated from her grandmother in a department store, then mistakenly running into the arms of a stranger. Incidents like this made Durant wary and scared through much of her childhood.

With effort and strategically positioned lighting sources, Durant has recounted being able to laboriously read books. She also used memorization and other mental methods to navigate her surroundings without assistance. During her interviews, Durant has also discussed being ostracized and bullied by other children growing up.

During her teenage years, an eye doctor casually mentioned to Durant the possibility of an operation that might improve her vision, but it was cost prohibitive.

== Later years ==
During her early thirties, the prospect of undergoing an operation to increase Olivia Durant's eyesight became more probable after the onset of cataracts. Insurance would not cover the restorative surgery due to her being legally blind, but could cover the cataract operation. Fortunately, the other surgery could be included along with.

Durant has described the risks this surgery entailed due to her having a deformed retina that, if damaged, could cause her to lose what little eyesight she had. Nevertheless, she was willing to take this risk. She searched for nearly a year to find the right surgeon.

After the surgery proved successful, Durant has discussed the unique identity crisis she underwent from being legally blind to having eyesight. Seeing her reflection in a mirror for the first time was revelatory and also disorienting. Not accustomed to her own image, Durant would automatically say "hello" to mirrors she passed in stores and other locations she experienced for the first time as a sighted person.

== Present day ==
Durant described in a series of TikTok videos how the operation gave her a second chance at life and a desire to make up for lost time. She began watching movies and TV shows she'd missed while legally blind, sought new adventures such as taking up boxing and becoming an aerialist. Durant also stated how she reexamined the world through fresh eyes while seeing as much as possible with a positive mental attitude and sharing that viewpoint with others.

Sharing her story on social media garnered immediate national attention, multiple interviews and a desire for Durant to give speeches pertaining to her unique experiences and points of view on life.

A story and video from USA Today further chronicles Olivia's quest to empower people through lectures to better understand the world of blindness as well as physical fitness, showing her performing as an aerialist.
