= David Willis (cartoonist) =

American web cartoonist (born 1979)

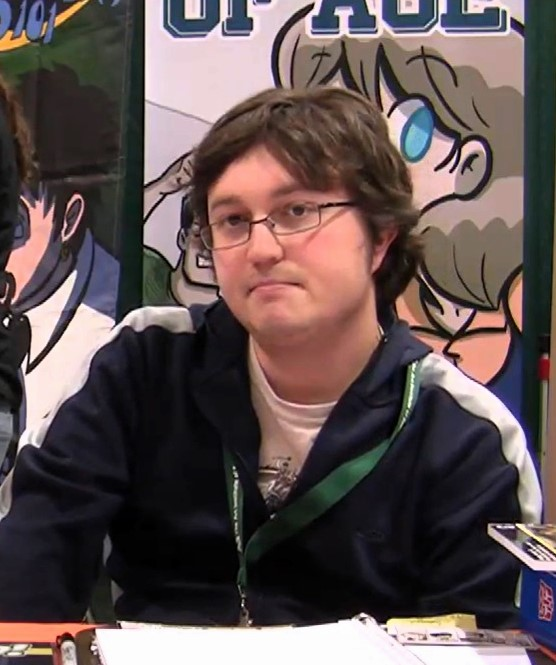
- Willis at the 2011 Emerald City Comic Con
- Born: April 3, 1979 (age 47)
- Occupation: Web cartoonist
- Known for: Roomies! It's Walky! Shortpacked! Joyce & Walky! Dumbing of Age
- Spouse: Maggie Weidner
- Children: 2

David M Willis (born April 3, 1979) is an American web cartoonist currently living in Columbus, Ohio. He is best known for his interconnected series of webcomics Roomies!, It's Walky!, Shortpacked!, and Dumbing of Age. Willis is also known online for his chatrooms and forums including "ItsWalky". KUTV in Salt Lake City calls him a satirist who is "a little bit edgy."

The shape-shifting robot franchise Transformers appears frequently in Willis' work. He was an administrator on Teletraan I, the Transformers Wiki from 2006 to 2008, when he facilitated a move from Wikia to its own site at tfwiki.net, remaining an administrator for the new site. Willis eventually became involved in official licensed Transformers artwork for Fun Publications' Transformers Collector's Club, particularly the regular club magazine feature Recordicons.

Previously featured at Keenspot with the comic of It's Walky! and the first months of Shortpacked!, Willis left to co-found Blank Label Comics in 2005. After Blank Label Comics was discontinued, he has continued his online presence at Shortpacked!, which has archives back to January 2005.

On September 19, 2008, Willis proposed to his girlfriend of four years, Maggie Weidner, in that day's episode of Shortpacked!. She accepted with a cartoon posted in the Shortpacked! blog. On September 21, 2009, Willis posted their wedding program. Their twin boys, Chase Alexander and Zachary Dashiel, were born on December 3, 2015.

== Webcomics ==
Roomies!, It's Walky!, Shortpacked!, and Joyce & Walky! are each set in the same fictional universe, with many characters appearing in multiple comics. This is collectively called the Walkyverse. Dumbing of Age shares many of the same characters with the previous titles, but it exists within a separate continuity, known as the Dumbiverse.

=== Roomies! ===
Roomies! is a webcomic by Willis starring the college adventures of two roommates, Danny and Joe. It ran from September 8, 1997, to December 20, 1999. Originally a daily comic published in the Indiana University student newspaper, the Indiana Daily Student, it was turned into a web comic in early 1999. It is a mix of daily gag strips and short stories, with the stories drifting towards more serious topics as the comic progressed.

Roomies! was succeeded by It's Walky!, a science fiction adventure comedy comic set in the same universe. The main cast of It's Walky! included some continuing characters from Roomies! — in particular Joyce, Danny's former stalker — and by the end most of the major characters from Roomies! had made appearances.

More recently, after he finished It's Walky!, David Willis restarted Roomies! as a daily gag strip, appearing on Tuesdays and Thursdays. It was also published as part of the Keenspot comic page in the Turlock, California newspaper, the Turlock Journal. Roomies! ended again on May 19, 2005, when David Willis left Keenspot to found Blank Label Comics.

=== It's Walky! ===
It's Walky! was a daily webcomic by Willis. It concerned the adventures of the fictional alien-fighting organization SEMME, and in particular current and previous members of Squad 128. The webcomic is a character-driven story, which has a very strong continuity, and It's Walky! has both comedic and dramatic moments. Though set in the present day, the alien elements and advanced technology involved brought science-fiction elements to the webcomic. The comic strip could (and often did) go from theological discussion to toilet humor within the same week.

It's Walky! was the direct continuation of Roomies!. The debut of It's Walky! is considered to have been on December 25, 1999, but the switch between the two was not instantaneous; science fiction elements had crept into the college environment of Roomies! long before, and the webcomic featured storylines from both for a while. A few characters from Roomies! became main characters in It's Walky!, and the remaining protagonists later made it into the cast as secondary characters.

It's Walky was followed by Shortpacked!, which was part of the same continuity but with an entirely different focus: the daily lives of a toy store's employees, including (oddly) SEMME veterans Mike and Robin. Donation-based It's Walky! epilogue strips ($100 for each strip) run by popular demand eventually led into, and were replaced by, a direct sequel called Joyce & Walky!, which started on August 1, 2005, and ended on May 17, 2015. It was subscription only. In the meantime, Willis had left Keenspot on May 19, 2005, to found Blank Label Comics.

In 2015, Willis and his wife launched It's Pregnancy!, a Tumblr comic about the birth of Joyce and Walky's son, in concert with the Willis couple's pregnancy.

=== Shortpacked! ===
Shortpacked! is a webcomic by Willis set in a toy store. It is part of the Blank Label Comics family. After putting an end to his successful webcomic It's Walky!, Willis decided to turn Shortpacked!, his autobiographical comic, into a new title. Premiering on January 17, 2005, the strip is based in the same universe as It's Walky! and Roomies!, and features two side characters from the previous comic, Robin and Mike. The primary inspiration behind Shortpacked was Willis' own experiences working retail at Toys "R" Us.

While Shortpacked! started off as primarily a gag strip, with little overarching plot, it began to develop plot-driven story arcs and complex characters while still alternating with gag strips. The comic also often included strips that take place outside of the regular setting and continuity, in particular one-shots lampooning pop-culture and comic figures such as Batman or Transformers.

Shortpacked! has also lampooned mainstream comic strips such as Luann and Funky Winkerbean. Shortpacked! showed 16-year-old Luann bragging about having large breasts and even depicted Luann giving the middle finger to Blondie. The parody of Funky Winkerbean showed Les Moore and his girlfriend Cayla Williams (the two got married in Willis' strip) having sex while a ghostly Lisa Moore (Les' late wife, who died in 2007 from cancer) watched over them in approval, and in another panel, the resulting baby, who looked like Lisa, was ghostly in appearance.

A Shortpacked! strip also appeared weekly on toynewsi.com, Toy News International's website, for 250 installments from August 20, 2006, until July 31, 2011.

On January 17, 2014, the series' ninth anniversary, Willis announced that he planned to conclude the Shortpacked! storyline over the following year, and would cease regular updates to the comic on its tenth anniversary. Shortpacked! accordingly ceased regular updates on January 17, 2015. Since then, the comic updates annually on April Fool's Day, with occasional updates also occurring with no set schedule.

=== Dumbing of Age ===
Dumbing of Age is a daily webcomic by Willis about college life at Indiana University with themes involving drama or comedy, occasionally with a mixture of both. The series itself is a reboot reusing characters from Willis' previous comics (Roomies!, It's Walky!, Joyce and Walky!, and Shortpacked!) but set in a new universe. Unlike Willis' previous Walkyverse comics, the series lacks science-fiction elements and instead focuses on slice-of-life plots. The comic is set in the present day and discusses themes of parental abuse, Christian religious fundamentalism, depression, attempted suicide, sexual assault, bigotry, and other mature themes.

The comic launched on September 10, 2010, the 13th anniversary of Roomies!, and is currently ongoing.

=== Other comics ===
Willis has a "Buffer Watch" on the page, indicating that there are comics drawn and uploaded weeks, or often months, ahead of schedule. Willis also offers a regularly updated set of pornographic comics involving the characters, published and sold on the separate website Slipshine. A sample of Willis's other projects include:

- Coloring T Campbell and John Waltrip's spy-romance comic Rip and Teri
- Drawing the last part of the original run of T Campbell and John Waltrip's Fans
- Recordicons, a comic series distributed as part of Fun Publications' Transformers Collector's Club magazine, based on the "Shattered Glass" versions of Ravage and the other Decepticon cassettes.
