= Worm Quartet =

Comedy music project

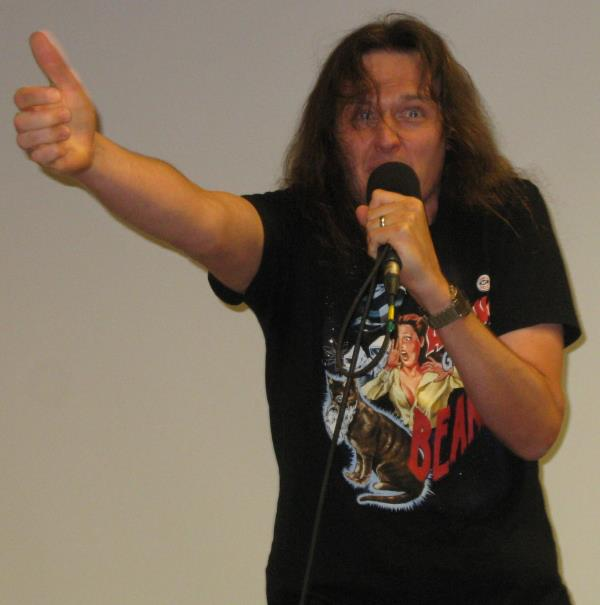
Shoebox of Worm Quartet performing in 2012.

Worm Quartet is a comedy music project created by Timothy F. Crist who uses the stage moniker ShoEboX and performs fast, synth-driven, pseudo-metal punk/pop. The band was formed in 1991 and its name is a reference to cartoons Crist used to draw.

Worm Quartet's I Bit William Shatner was featured as a Top 5 song on the Dr. Demento Show in 2001, Frank's Not In The Band Anymore was Dr. Demento's 2nd most requested song of the year in 2002, Great Idea For A Song was the most requested song in 2004, You Were Wrong Cabinet Sanchez reached #15 in 2006, and Fueled By Angst reached #7 in 2014. The Ballad of Doctor Stopp was nominated for a Logan Award in 2013 after having previously won the Outstanding Original Comedy Song award in 2011, Fueled by Angst, and Math is Bulls**t (featuring Insane Ian) were both nominated in 2015, and I Don't Matter (featuring Chris Mezzolesta) was nominated in 2017.

== History ==
=== Pre-Music ===
While in high school, Crist created a cartoon featuring four worms which were depicted at various times singing songs with silly lyrics, or on mock record covers such as Worm Quartet Sings The Songs Of Barry Manilow While Puking And Pissing On Lobsters.

=== Early years ===
Around 1991 Crist decided to begin producing music under the Worm Quartet name. He recorded the album Pass the Potatoes on cassette using a Yamaha PSR-6 keyboard. Despite being disappointed in the quality of the first album, Crist went on to record 10 more tapes of Worm Quartets very different style of music. In 1993, upon graduating high school and entering college, Crist was joined by Tony "Coffee" Roche on guitar, and Kevin Morgan on drums and recorded No Talent Implied which was to be a demo recording. Roche left the band shortly after and was ostensibly replaced by a drum machine. Crist and Morgan went on to record the first official Worm Quartet tape, "Urine Sampler".

=== Current era ===
Crist moved to Syracuse, NY for software engineering work in 1997. Morgan left the band shortly after, so Crist began recording solo with the use of digital studio software, keyboards, and effects pedals, creating the first full-length Worm Quartet CD, Sumophobia. Worm Quartet was played several times on the Syracuse radio stations WXXE, and WERW. He continued working in this manner while he moved to nearby Rochester, NY in 2001.

He returned to Syracuse on August 18, 2001 for his first live performance, part of "TorpedoFest", a benefit for Torpedo Magazine at the Old Parochial League where he sang over a prerecorded CD of the instrumental parts of the music.

Worm Quartet released Stupid Video Game Music on December 19, 2001 which featured the award-winning song Frank's Not In The Band Anymore. For the next several years, he would regularly play live performances. In January, 2004, he released the album Faster Than A Speeding Mullet.

Crist collaborated with Rob Balder under the name "Baldbox" in 2009 to release one CD ("The Dumb Album") and several follow-up songs, which have also been played frequently by Dr. Demento and other radio shows. From that album, the track USF'nA was the 12th most requested song on Dr. Demento in 2009.

== Discography ==
=== Studio albums ===
- Sumophobia (1999) Re-mastered re-release (2006)
- Stupid Video Game Music (2001) Re-mastered re-release (2007)
- Faster Than A Speeding Mullet (2004)
- Mental Notes (2007)
- Songs of the Maniacs (2012)
- The Pac-Man EP (released via Kickstarter) (2020)
- Carpe Tedium (2023)

=== Other releases ===
- Urine Sampler (1996)
- Unreleasable (2007)
- The Dumb Album (with Rob Balder as Baldbox, 2009)

== Members ==
=== Current ===
- Timothy F. Crist as ShoEboX

=== Past ===
- Tony "Coffee" Roche (guitar)
- Kevin Morgan (drums)
