= Rob Balder =

American cartoonist

Robert Balder
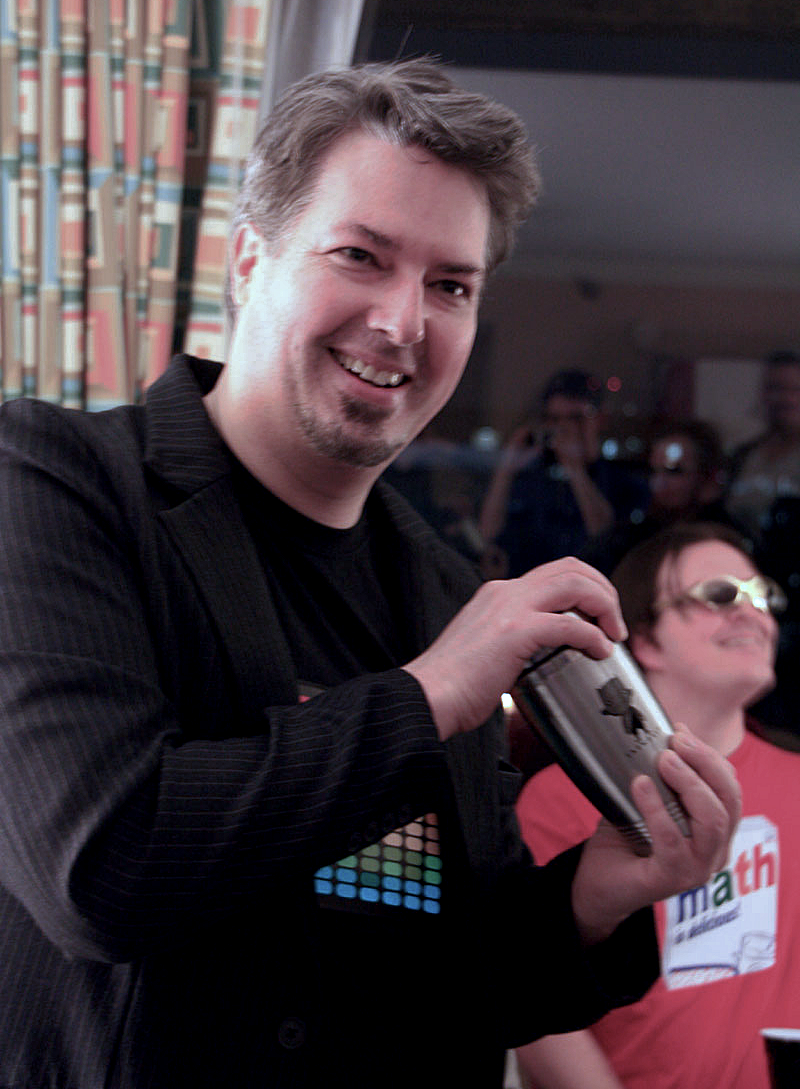
- Born: 1969 (age 56–57) Detroit, Michigan
- Areas: Webcomics, filk music
- Notable works: PartiallyClips; Erfworld
- Awards: Pegasus Award

Robert T. Balder is a professional cartoonist and singer-songwriter. He graduated from Roanoke College with a major in English in 1993 and, after a variety of jobs, entered a seven-year career in IT, starting as a manager of database development, which he left for his current career.

== Comics ==
As a comic author, he was first published in Scene magazine in 1998. In 2001, he started PartiallyClips, a social commentary clip art webcomic also featured in the Anchorage Press, Cleveland Free Times, Concord Mirror, East Bay Express, Houston Press, Manchester Mirror, Metroland, Nth Degree, Salem Observer and the Other Paper. He is also the writer for the Erfworld webcomic, which was listed as one of Time magazine's "Top 10 Graphic Novels of 2007". As of October 13, 2019, Erfworld has been discontinued for personal reasons.

Balder is well-known within the webcomic creator community, as evidenced by his writing of guest comics for other webcomics: Fragile Gravity, Goats, Order of the Stick, Sluggy Freelance, and Wondermark. In 2006, he partnered with Pete Abrams of Sluggy Freelance, to create a retail market card game themed around Sluggy Freelance called Get Nifty.

In August 2010, he co-wrote a 24-page comic called A Duel in the Somme, based on a story by the science fiction author Ben Bova and illustrated by the syndicated cartoonist Bill Holbrook. The comic was released on its own website under a Creative Commons license at a rate of one page per day and used a reward-driven donation model for revenue.

== Music ==
Balder writes and sings comedy songs, and has recorded two CDs. The title track from his first CD, "Rich Fantasy Lives", was co-written with Tom Smith, and won the 2007 Pegasus Award for Best Filk Song; they had been nominated the previous year for the same award. He was also one of the seven founders of the FuMP, or "Funny Music Project", along with Devo Spice, Luke Ski, Tom Smith, Possible Oscar, Raymond and Scum, Spaff, and Worm Quartet, in which they present new songs released under a Creative Commons license.

His comedy music has received national airplay in the United States on the syndicated Dr. Demento Show. His song "Gamer Funk" was the #1 most requested song on the Dr. Demento Show in both September and October 2009, and was the third most requested song for that entire year. In February 2009, Balder began a collaboration with ShoEboX of Worm Quartet called "Baldbox". The duo released one CD (The Dumb Album) and several follow-up songs, which have also been played frequently by Dr. Demento and other terrestrial radio shows.

== Professional and public ==
Balder is a frequent guest and program participant at science fiction, comic, gaming and anime conventions, participating in as many as 20 events a year. Several conventions have invited him as Guest of Honor, including Capclave, CoastCon, I-Con, MidSouthCon, and OASIS.
