= Johnny Wander =

Webcomic

- Strip #191 "Motivational Speaker", published September 21, 2010
- Author(s): Ananth Hirsh and Yuko Ota
- Website: johnnywander.com
- Current status/schedule: updated Tuesday and Thursday
- Launch date: September 30, 2008
- Genre: Slice of life story

Johnny Wander is a former webcomic written by Ananth Hirsh and illustrated by Yuko Ota. It was published bi-weekly. In its earlier days, the comic generally focused on slice of life stories involving Ananth, Yuko, and their friends and family following graduation from college. However, the comic occasionally encompasses unrelated fantasy storylines. The comic is currently focusing on one of its ongoing fictional storylines, "Barbarous." The name "Johnny Wander" is meant to evoke the creators' desire to use the comic to "wander" through whatever topics interest them at the moment.

The webcomic has been generally well-received, with reviewers calling it as a humorous and sweet comic that invites new readers to continue reading. The artwork has also been praised for its depth and quality. The first physical book collection "Johnny Wander Vol. 1: Don't Burn the House Down" was published in 2010.

== History ==
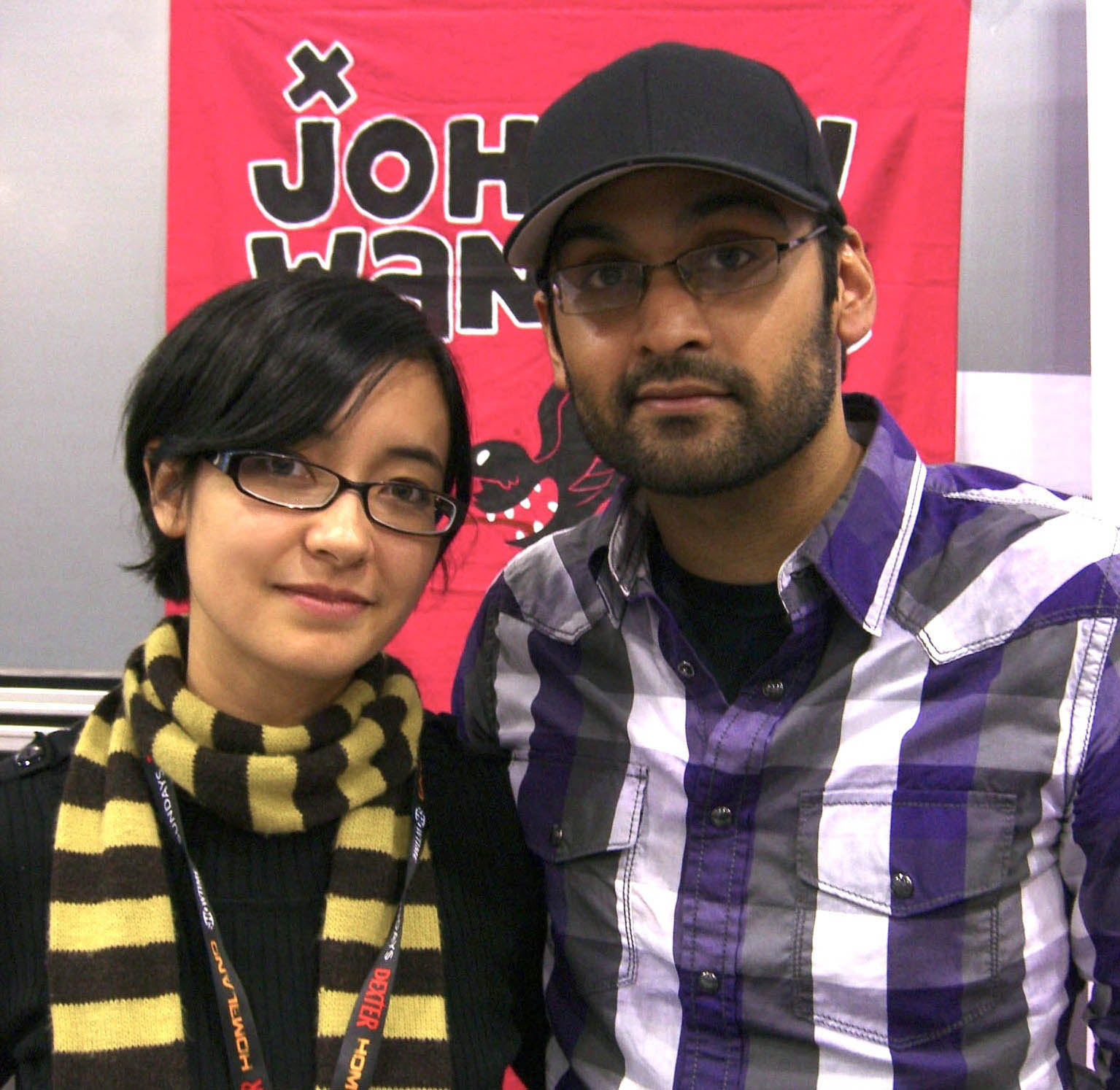
Ota and Hirsh at New York Comic Con in 2011

From 2006 to 2010, Ananth Hirsh (then called Ananth Panagariya) wrote the webcomic AppleGeeks, in collaboration with the artist Mohammad Haque. This strip was published as a comic book by Dark Horse Comics in 2008.

Hirsh and Ota started posting Johnny Wander in 2008. Originally intended to encompass more subjects than autobiography, Ota picked the name "Johnny Wander" because it sounded both catchy and broad in scope. The name implied that the two could "wander" to whatever subject they were interested in. The first few test strips were done sporadically, as Ota was attending school and Hirsh was working full-time as a graphic designer. They eventually decided on autobiographical work because it seemed quicker to do, though the webcomic quickly became focused and polished. A collection of the comics, entitled Johnny Wander Vol. 1: Don't Burn the House Down, was published in 2010. The book was released under a Creative Commons license. A second and third volume were subsequently published, entitled Johnny Wander Vol. 2: Escape to New York and Johnny Wander Vol. 3: Ballad of Laundry Cat, respectively.

In February 2012, Hirsh and Ota serialized an excerpt from their graphic novel Lucky Penny on the Johnny Wander site in place of regular autobiographical updates. The book was later published by Oni Press, and was republished in color in 2022. Following Lucky Penny, Hirsh and Ota shifted their focus toward subsequent fiction projects Is This What You Wanted and the urban fantasy series Barbarous, both of which were serialized on Johnny Wander.

== Style and format ==
The webcomic generally focuses on slice of life storylines involving the lives of the creators and their friends. Occasionally, it ventures into surrealist short fantasy stories. Each comic consists of a stand-alone, single page comic. Often, the inspiration for a comic comes from a simple conversation or occurrence in the characters' everyday lives. However, one storyline, The Girl with the Skeleton Hand, involves a woman's romance with a personified death. "Delilah and the Basilisk" and "Lucky Penny" are among the other serial fiction pieces published on the site. The artwork is inked by hand and done in grayscale. First, a strip is penciled, then inked with a brush, and finally shaded and toned in Adobe Photoshop.

== Characters ==
- Ananth Hirsh – The comic writer, he describes himself as a comic book nerd. His hat constantly obscures his eyes, which are never seen.
- Yuko Ota – The comic illustrator and inker. Attended college with Conrad and John.
- Conrad – Originally a roommate of the two main characters, Conrad likes to eat breakfast constantly.
- John – Another former roommate of the group; John often spouts seemingly random and surreal statements unrelated to the situation.

== Reception ==
Greg McElhatton of Read About Comics called Johnny Wander one of his favorite webcomics. He went on to describe it as "consistently funny and sweet", and praised it for its comedic timing and sharp character art. Arun Kale of Helter Skelter magazine called the webcomic "a light-hearted, honest look at life".

Gary Tyrrell of Fleen compared Johnny Wander to Archie Comics in its accessibility and ability to make new readers feel welcome. Mike Braff of Suvudu praised the webcomic, calling its writing good and its art "breathtaking".

In 2017, Our Cats Are More Famous Than Us: A Johnny Wander Collection won an Ignatz Award for "Outstanding Collection". In 2019, Barbarous won a National Cartoonists Society Division Award in the "On-Line Comics – Long Form" category.
