= Dueling Analogs =

Webcomic

- Author: Steve Napierski
- Website: duelinganalogs.com
- Current status/schedule: Monday & Thursday
- Launch date: November 17, 2005
- End date: July 31, 2018
- Genre(s): Video games, Parody, Gag-a-day

Dueling Analogs (a pun on the Dual Analog Controller) was a humor website that hosted webcomics, videos, and posts focusing on video games. The webcomics were drawn by Steve Napierski (also the creator of The Outer Circle). The website was launched on November 17, 2005, and new comics were posted every Monday and Thursday. Dueling Analogs is a gaming comic and as such most of the comics take place in the universe of the games discussed. There are few ongoing stories or plotlines as all of the comics are self-encapsulated (one exception is the trial of King Bowser); however, there are repeated themes such as 'Rejected Mega Man Villains', 'Games that I am glad were never made' and 'What if...?'. Dueling Analogs is also a founding member of a webcomic group of gaming comics. The comic came to prominence in the webcomic community after the "So Dark the Contra of Man" strip.

In 2006, Dueling Analogs had a partnernship with Firaxis Games to publish comics to market the developer's Civilization IV: Beyond the Sword. Dueling Analogs received roughly 100,000 daily pageviews in 2008.

On July 31, 2018, Napierski announced that he was no longer going to update the website.

== Tagline ==
Dueling Analogs is a color semi-weekly webcomic that lampoons the characters, culture and subtext of modern gaming culture.

== Characters ==
- Harvey – Harvey is the voice of Dueling Analogs. Whenever the comic needs to talk directly to the audience about a topic, Harvey is there. Harvey's design is modeled after the look of its creator from his high school years. This is in contrast to the character Steve from The Outer Circle which was modeled after a more recent look of the creator.

First Appearance: 2005-11-29, strip 4.

- Mario – Though not created by Steve Napierski, Mario has appeared in so many Dueling Analogs strips that he is considered a regular member of the comics cast.

First Appearance: 2005-12-01, strip 5.

- Jeremy the Sony PR Gnome – The voice of Sony. Jeremy acts as the counterpoint to the voice of Harvey’s pro-Nintendo views. Could possibly be a parody of the gnome from Amélie or the gnome feature in the Travelocity commercials: Where is my Gnome?.

First Appearance: 2006-07-31, strip 76.

- Xed Box – If Microsoft had a spokesperson in Dueling Analogs, Xed Box would be it. Unfortunately, Xed Box is nothing more than a box with a crudely drawn "X" on it.

First Appearance: 2006-08-16, strip 81.

- Jon Shelf American – Jon Shelf American is what's considered Dueling Analogs` stereotypical gamer (introvert, unsociable and still living at home with his mother). Name based on George Liquor American created by John Kricfalusi.

First Appearance: 2007-01-15, strip 130.

Harvey	Mario	Jeremy the Sony PR Gnome	Xed Box	John Shelf American

== Parodies ==
Dueling Analogs has featured such games as Final Fantasy VII, The Smurfs, Mega Man, Karnov, Super Smash Bros. and Final Fantasy X-2.

In 2011, Dueling Analogs created Portal Tetris, a parody game that combines elements of the video games Portal and Tetris. According to the author Sebastian Möring, gamers are unlikely to find the game enjoyable since it does not need gamer involvement and no longer retains the central challenge. Instead, he said, Portal Tetris is "thought-provoking" in encouraging gamers to imagine where portals could be positioned within Tetris and how that could be impact the gameplay.

== Awards and nominations ==
Dueling Analogs has been nominated for two Web Cartoonists' Choice Awards.

- 2006: Outstanding Gaming Comic, Outstanding Web Design

Dueling Analogs has been voted best gaming webcomic of the week by the readers of Joystiq on nine occasions: May 23, 2006, June 3, 2006, June 24, 2006, February 13, 2007, March 27, 2007, May 22, 2007, October 23, 2007, April 23, 2008, May 29, 2008

== Notables ==
- Dueling Analogs is a featured webcomic on GameRevolution.
- Dueling Analogs was a monthly comic in Hardcore Gamer Magazine from June through November 2007.

== Reception ==
Amy Bouman of Maximum PC called Dueling Analogs "pretty consistently hilarious" in satirizing video games and players. Destructoid's Hamza Aziz lauded it as "a great series", citing its frequent exploration of gaming culture's "sexual, perverted and down right demented" elements.

The authors Steve Horton and Sam Romero found Dueling Analogs to consist primarily of single-panel cartoons that are an "acerbic, edgy, and satirical take" on video games. They noted that among numerous gaming-focused comedy webcomics, Dueling Analogs established a strong following and was covered by numerous gaming news publications.

== Reviews ==
- Article about Dueling Analogs on Destructoid.
- BBC Article about webcomics.
- Article on 411mania discussing gaming webcomics.
- Dueling Analogs Konami Code comic was mentioned in a TechRepublic article.
- Dueling Analogs Living Achievements Vicariously comic was mentioned in a 411mania article.

== Interviews ==
- Interview with Steve Napierski on Joystiq.
- Author Steve Napierski, was interviewed in Zoinks! Magazine about Dueling Analogs and his other comic, The Outer Circle in October 2006.
