= DragonFable =

2006 online video game

- Developer(s): Artix Entertainment
- Publisher(s): Artix Entertainment
- Engine: Adobe Flash
- Release: 30 November 2005 (Beta); 9 June 2006 (Live)
- Genre(s): Role-playing game
- Mode(s): Single-player

DragonFable is a free-to-play, online, browser-based, single-player, fantasy, role-playing game developed by Artix Entertainment and updated on a weekly basis. Players may access locked game content by upgrading to a premium account for a one-time fee.

== Gameplay ==
As is typical with online fantasy games, play is initiated by creating a basic character profile, which includes choosing a name, gender, and base class (mage, rogue, or warrior). The game is then played exclusively through point and click commands to navigate the player character across the play area, interact with non-player characters (NPCs), engage in combat, progress the storyline, etc.

While in a battle sequence, the character may be assisted by NPCs that have joined their party or by pets that have been activated. The player may also switch among a collection of weapons and equippable items, which are generally chosen based upon the items' respective core element (e.g., water, wind, fire, stone, etc.). The battles are turn-based, giving the player an indefinite amount of time to choose from an assortment of actions, either offensive, defensive, or a combination thereof. The character's available actions are determined by the character's class and "armor" (e.g., ninja, pirate, ranger, etc.), with new armors being introduced on a regular basis. In general, battles occur within Quests that contribute to the overarching storyline and typically features a "boss" character, which will be a particularly powerful NPC or monster, often having a small dialogue with the player pre-fight (and sometimes post-fight). Defeating enemies throughout a quest earns the character gold and experience points, the latter contributing to the character moving up in skill level when enough experience has been earned. Weapons and other items are "dropped" when the quest's boss has been defeated.

While new quests and story elements are added on a near-weekly basis, the previously developed story elements remain playable both to new and to seasoned players, with most enemies' skill levels increasing (i.e., scaling) along with the character's level.

== Plot ==
=== Book 1: Orb Saga ===
The character is introduced into the story as a hero from an unknown location arriving to Lore (the world of DragonFable), destined to become a Dragon Lord who will own one of the two great dragons, unhatched in separate boxes (black and white) at the start of the game. The hero obtains the dragon egg from the Black Dragon Box, and the primary antagonists, the Doom Knight Sepulchure and his master, possesses the dragon egg from the white dragon box. The storyline in Book 1 revolves around a chase from both parties to obtain all of the Elemental Orbs; Sepulchure wishes to use the Orbs as a means to achieve ultimate power and world domination, unaware his master is using him as a puppet to shroud the world in darkness. In addition to the series of Elemental Orb story arcs, there are many intertwining subplots in Book 1, creating a rich world full of creative and often comical discoveries. Temporary seasonal quest chains also appear during real-world holiday seasons, which occasionally tie into the main plot line, sometimes in major ways.

In the climax of Book 1, Sepulchure succeeds in gathering all of the Elemental Orbs, forming the "Ultimate Orb", before being betrayed and left for dead by his master, who uses the Orb to become a powerful darkness Dracolich. The darkness Dracolich is destroyed by the hero and their dragon, though Sepulchure survives and goes into hiding.

=== Book 2: Elemental Dissonance ===
Book 2 takes place right after the ending of Book 1. The chase for the Elemental Orbs and the ensuing war resulted in extreme imbalances within the elements, and the disappearance of Warlic. In addition, a group of aliens known as the Ateala have escaped to Lore from their planet being destroyed by an infernal known as Wargoth. The character assists the Ateala, both to stop Wargoth from also destroying Lore, and also to find Warlic. During the hunt for Warlic, the character meets a man known as The Professor, as well as Konnan, who is revealed to have survived the events of Book 1. Throughout the story, the character recruits Xan, frees Jaania, a former friend of Xan and Warlic from an ice crystal caused by one of Xan and Warlic's feuds centuries prior (shown in the Alexander quest chain), and learns that The Professor and Wargoth are the human and infernal halves of Warlic, respectively. Warlic had generated too much mana while defending Falconreach in the book 1 finale, and split himself as a result. In order to bring back Warlic and to stop Wargoth, the character and their allies forcibly merge Wargoth and the Professor back together. After the battle, Jaania, disgusted by the destruction wrought by magic, freezes the character, Warlic, and Xan in a fit of anger, and leaves.

=== Book 3: The End of Magic ===
The character awakens to a vastly-expanded Lore, after being encased in ice for several years. Jaania has created, and leads the anti-magic organization known as The Rose, who have become a major power within the continent of Greenguard. Similarly to Book 1, there are numerous intertwining subplots, with the main story arc being The End of Magic.

=== Side quests ===
In February 2010, the ArchKnight game and quest chain was continued and completed within DragonFable, with Ash (normally an NPC) as the player character. This quest chain is only accessible to those with premium accounts either in AdventureQuest or in DragonFable. In 2012, the Alexander quest chain, which follows the young mage Alexander during his training was released; it explains the origins of the characters Warlic, Xan, and Jaania, all of whom are integral to the main storyline.

=== In-game events ===
DragonFable has several recurring holiday events. These include Valentine's Day (named Hero's Heart Day in game), April Fools' Day (a random in-game prank, such as switching DragonFable's NPCs with NPCs from MechQuest), Halloween (named Mogloween in game), Christmas (named Frostval in game), Friday the 13th, Talk Like a Pirate Day and Thanksgiving (named Thankstaking in game). They also have occasional hunts, like gourd, egg and chest hunting.

George Lowe, a voice actor best known for his role as Space Ghost in Space Ghost Coast to Coast, voiced himself in a live event known as Falconreach Idle on 19 November 2010.

== Reception ==
A few months after its live release in 2006, Chris Barylick, from The Mac Observer, while acknowledging an instant obsession with this "cool Flash-based role playing game", reported that DragonFable was "not perfect", nor that the title offered the same options as other RPG titles like World of Warcraft or Neverwinter Nights, but was considered a worth of purchase. Andre Haas, from About.com, called the game an improved version of AdventureQuest and recommended it to the fans of the latter title.
