= RealmsCon =

Multi-genre convention in Corpus Christi, Texas

Coordinates: 27°46′52″N 97°23′38″W

- RealmsCon logo.
- Status: On hiatus
- Genre: Multi-genre
- Venue: Emerald Beach Hotel
- Location: Corpus Christi, Texas
- Country: United States
- Inaugurated: 2005
- Attendance: 1,542 in 2008

RealmsCon was an annual three-day multi-genre convention held during September/October at the Emerald Beach Hotel in Corpus Christi, Texas. The convention was created in 2005 by Daniel Velasquez.

== Programming ==
The convention typically featured an artists alley, cosplay contests, movie rooms, rave, role-playing, table-top gaming, video games, vendors, and workshops.

== History ==
RealmsCon started in 2005 as a science-fiction and comic book event with some anime, until the organizers found that most attendees were coming to the convention for anime. The convention in 2005 cost $20,000 and rose to $50,000+ in 2009. The convention in 2013 had content from the South Texas Underground Film Festival. In 2014 a cosplay fundraiser walk was held to support the Coastal Bend Court Appointed Special Advocates (CASA). The convention again supported CASA in 2015. RealmsCon had free outdoor events in 2018. RealmsCon 2020 and 2021 were cancelled due to the COVID-19 pandemic. RealmsCon went on hiatus starting in 2022.

=== Event history ===
Dates	Location	Atten.	Guests
August 19–21, 2005	Ramada Inn Bayfront; Corpus Christi, Texas	800	Melissa Benson, Ben Dunn, Richard Epcar, Lisa Furukawa, Tiffany Grant, Erin Gray, George Manley, Heather Martin, Jason Martin, Peter Mayhew, and Chris Patton.
September 15–17, 2006	Omni Marina Hotel; Corpus Christi, Texas	1,148	Stephanie Celeste, Lisa Furukawa, Tiffany Grant, Rivkah Greulich, Samantha Inoue-Harte, George Manley, Mike McFarland, Vic Mignogna, and Robert Navarro.
August 24–26, 2007	Omni Corpus Christi Hotel Bayfront Tower; Corpus Christi, Texas	1,500	Akai SKY, Christopher Ayres, Greg Ayres, Juno Blair B., Amelie Belcher, Stephanie Celeste, Larry Elmore, Lisa Furukawa, Tiffany Grant, Illich Guardiola, Chris Hazelton, Samantha Inoue-Harte, Elektra Knight, Wendee Lee, George Manley, Robert Navarro, James O'Barr, Wendy Powell, and Amanda Tomasch.
September 5–7, 2008	Holiday Inn Corpus Christi-Emerald Beach; Corpus Christi, Texas	1,542	Akai SKY, Robert Axelrod, Christopher Ayres, Greg Ayres, Juno Blair B., Stephanie Celeste, C.J. Collins, Lisa Furukawa, Matt Herms, Samantha Inoue-Harte, Elektra Knight, George Manley, Meredith Placko, Wendy Powell, The Royal Dead, Heather Scott, and Spike Spencer.
October 2–4, 2009	Holiday Inn Corpus Christi-Emerald Beach; Corpus Christi, Texas		Hillary Adams, Christopher Ayres, Greg Ayres, Juno Blair, Stephanie Celeste, C.J. Collins, Lisa Furukawa, Caitlin Glass, Tiffany Grant, Yaya Han, Samantha Inoue-Harte, Elektra Knight, George Manley, Mike McFarland, Vic Mignogna, James O'Barr, Benjamin Pearce, Sylvia Pearce, Laura Phillips, Meredith Placko, Wendy Powell, Rocieru, Heather Scott, The Slants, Chuck Stroschein, Peter Thomas, Mia Ward, and William Ward.
October 1–3, 2010	American Bank Center; Corpus Christi, Texas		Hillary Adams, Airship Isabella, Christopher Ayres, Greg Ayres, Michael Berryman, Steven Blum, C.J. Collins, Yaya Han, Irwin Keyes, Elektra Knight, James O'Barr, Benjamin Pearce, Sylvia Pearce, Li "PikminLink" Kovacs, Heather Scott, Chuck Stroschein, Peter Thomas, Mia Ward, and William Ward.
October 7–9, 2011	American Bank Center; Corpus Christi, Texas		Abney Park, Hillary Adams, Airship Isabella, Sarah Bloom, Stephanie Celeste, C.J. Collins, Amaya De'Morte, Tiffany Grant, Joe Hernandez, Samantha Inoue-Harte, Jonathan Joss, Elektra Knight, George Manley, Vic Mignogna, James O'Barr, Benjamin Pearce, Meredith Placko, Chuck Stroschein, and Mia Ward.
October 12–14, 2012	American Bank Center; Corpus Christi, Texas		Hillary Adams, After Midnight Productions, Airship Isabella, Stephanie Celeste, C.J. Collins, Sam de la Rosa, Digital Outburst, Final Weapon, Crispin Freeman, Lisa Furukawa, Samantha Inoue-Harte, Jonathan Joss, Joe Jusko, Elektra Knight, James O'Barr, Benjamin Pearce, Chuck Stroschein, Mia Ward, Terrance Zdunich, Noel Gugliemi, and Sergio Guerra.
October 4–6, 2013	American Bank Center; Corpus Christi, Texas		Hillary Adams, After Midnight Productions, Airship Isabella, Yunmao Ayakawa, Sam de la Rosa, Marie Doll, Quinton Flynn, Claire Hamilton, Richard Horvitz, Jonathan Joss, Elektra Knight, Vic Mignogna, James O'Barr, Rocieru, Salia, Rikki Simons, The Steam Engine Intrepid, Chuck Stroschein, John Swasey, J. Michael Tatum, Voltaire, Mia Ward, Tony Todd, Verne Troyer, The Honky Tonk Man, and Luke Williams.
October 3–5, 2014	American Bank Center; Corpus Christi, Texas		After Midnight Productions, Airship Isabella, Mr. Creepy Pasta, Sam de la Rosa, Todd Haberkorn, Claire Hamilton, Chuck Huber, Jonathan Joss, Maurice LaMarche, Cherami Leigh, Mariedoll, Vic Mignogna, Cara Nicole, James O'Barr, Rob Paulsen, Rocieru, The Steam Engine Intrepid, Steam Powered Giraffe, Chuck Stroschein, Mark Texeira, Mia Ward, Eric Wile, and Cary-Hiroyuki Tagawa.
October 2–4, 2015	American Bank Center; Corpus Christi, Texas		After Midnight Productions, Airship Isabella, Tony Bedard, Steven Blum, Stephanie Celeste, Dameon Clarke, Mr. Creepy Pasta, Kyle Hebert, Chuck Huber, Jonathan Joss, Carl Martin, Charles Martinet, Cara Nicole, James O'Barr, Rocieru, Chris Sabat, Chii Sakurabi, Sean Schemmel, Ian Sinclair, Kevin Sorbo, The Steam Engine Intrepid, Steam Powered Giraffe, Chuck Stroschein, Alfred Trujillo, Eric Vale, Voltaire, and Ernie Reyes, Jr.
September 30 - October 2, 2016	American Bank Center; Corpus Christi, Texas		501st Legion, Airship Isabella, ArcAttack, Linda Ballantyne, Michael Biehn, Gilbert Carrizales, Stephanie Celeste, Mr. Creepy Pasta, Katie Griffin, Jonathan Joss, Christina Marie Kelly, Josh Martin, Jason Narvy Toby Proctor, Chris Rager, Monica Rial, Susan Roman, Chris Sabat, Sean Schemmel, Paul Schrier, The Steam Engine Intrepid, Chuck Stroschein, Billy West, David Yost, Chris Farrell, and Mat Fraser.
October 6–8, 2017	American Bank Center; Corpus Christi, Texas		Airship Isabella, Karan Ashley, Stephanie Celeste, Luci Christian, Caitlin Glass, Todd Haberkorn, Sephi Hakubi, Walter E. Jones, Jonathan Joss, James O'Barr, Brina Palencia, Blake Shepard, The Steam Engine Intrepid, Chuck Stroschein, J. Michael Tatum, Aurelio Voltaire, and Tyler Mane.
September 28-30, 2018	Omni Corpus Christi Hotel; Corpus Christi, Texas		501st Legion, Jason David Frank, Josh Grelle, Sephi Hakubi, Cherami Leigh, Vic Mignogna, Trina Nishimura, James O'Barr, Bryce Papenbrook, Adrian Paul, Steam Powered Giraffe, Lara Woodhull, Ken Foree, and Sam J. Jones.
October 4-6, 2019	Emerald Beach Hotel; Corpus Christi, Texas		Stephanie Celeste, Sephi Hakubi, Brittney Karbowski, James O'Barr, Raj Ramayya, H. Gorlitz Scott, Austin Tindle, Alexis Tipton, Gilbert Carrizales, DJ Qualls, DJ Sebris, DJ Sephi Hakubi, Sergio Guerra, Nimbuz, and Ty Olsson.
