= Proni =

Proni may refer to:

- Proni (Greece), a town of ancient Cephallenia, Greece
- Alessandro Proni (born 1982), Italian bicycle racer
- Tullio Proni (born 1948), American psychologist and artist
- Public Record Office of Northern Ireland (PRONI)
