= AdventureQuest Worlds =

Massively multiplayer online role-playing game

- Developer: Artix Entertainment
- Publisher: Artix Entertainment
- Engine: Adobe Flash
- Release: October 14, 2008
- Genre: Massively multiplayer online role-playing game
- Mode: Multiplayer

AdventureQuest Worlds is a browser-based massively multiplayer online role-playing game (MMORPG) released by Artix Entertainment in 2008.

== Synopsis ==
The player character, referred to as 'the Hero', arrives in the midst of a war pitting the forces of Good against Evil. Answering the summons of the Good army, the Hero joins the fight against the undead, led by Sepulchure, commander and emperor of Evil. The tides of battle take an unexpected turn when the factions are overpowered by Chaos ruler, Drakath. Faced with this new threat, the Hero embarks on a journey to face and defeat Drakath, along with his formidable 13 Lords of Chaos, all determined to bend the world to Drakath's twisted power.

== Gameplay ==
AdventureQuest Worlds is a massively multiplayer online role-playing game set in the world of Lore, where players traverse its landscape and engage in quests and battles against various monsters, all while interacting with or alongside other players and non-playable characters (NPCs). When making a character avatar, players can select from the game's four starting classes—Warrior, Rogue, Mage, or Healer—each armed with a set of four active abilities alongside a shared "auto-attack" ability. Progression with these classes is earned through accumulating class points in battles, which unlock both active and passive abilities as players gain ranks. Likewise, players gain experience points (XP) by defeating monsters and completing quests. While optional, the game offers a plethora of storylines and reputations for players to explore and advance through at their own discretion. By completing these storylines and ascending through ranks in reputations, players gain badges and unlock access to new classes, quests, and additional storyline content and rewards.

For added in-game benefits, players can opt to purchase a membership, unlocking exclusive maps, storylines, cosmetics, and faster acquisition for specific items. Additionally, players can purchase Adventure Coins, the game's premium currency, for immediate access to most classes and exclusive cosmetics.

The game allows players to switch between various class types at any given moment, often to suit a variety of situations.

AdventureQuest Worlds hosts special events during specific occasions, introducing new storylines, quests, and cosmetics on Friday. These events vary in cycles: some are one-time occurrences, while others are seasonal, returning annually. Participating in these events often allows players to obtain exclusive, event-specific items that are unavailable at any other time in the game. Standout events in AdventureQuest Worlds include its anniversary celebrations on October 10th, Frostvale during Christmas, Mogloween around Halloween, New Year's celebrations, Talk Like A Pirate Day, and birthdays of Artix Entertainment's staff. Some events feature live appearances by guest stars such as Korn, Voltaire, One-Eyed Doll, George Lowe, Paul and Storm, Jonathan Coulton, the cast of Ctrl+Alt+Del, Ayi Jihu, ArcAttack, They Might Be Giants, Andrew Huang, Mia J. Park, The Crüxshadows, Dreamers, Cassandra Peterson as Elvira, and Michael Sinterniklaas as the voice of Deady.

== Development ==
On October 16, 2015, developer Adam Bohn announced that initial plans for a server rewrite to migrate the game's engine from the Adobe Flash sourcing to the Unity engine had instead been planned to be placed within a mobile port of AdventureQuest Worlds, dubbed "Project Omni: AdventureQuest Worlds", slated for a release in 2016. However, this project had been delayed multiple times, and had its name eventually changed to AdventureQuest Worlds: Infinity in 2023, with a Steam port also being planned.

== Reception ==
Kotaku's Mike Fahey praised the idea of using advertisements when the player died. Pete Davison, from GamePro, also noted the advertisements upon death, calling it an "interesting" idea.
