= George Lowe =

American voice actor and comedian (1957–2025)

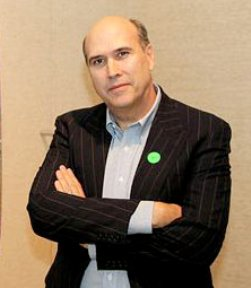
- Lowe in 2010
- Born: George Edward Lowe; November 10, 1957; Dunedin, Florida, U.S.
- Died: March 2, 2025 (aged 67); Lakeland, Florida, U.S.
- Occupations: Voice actor; comedian
- Notable work: Space Ghost Coast to Coast; Cartoon Planet; The Brak Show

Comedy career
- Years active: 1980–2020; 2024–2025
- Medium: Television; films

George Edward Lowe (November 10, 1957 – March 2, 2025) was an American voice actor and comedian whose voice roles included Space Ghost on the animated series Space Ghost Coast to Coast and its spin-off, Cartoon Planet. He continued to voice Space Ghost in several cameos in other programs for several years following the conclusion of the series. Lowe made recurring voice appearances on Aqua Teen Hunger Force and Robot Chicken.

== Early life ==
Born in Dunedin, Florida, on November 10, 1957, Lowe grew up in nearby Brooksville. At age 15, Lowe got his first radio job with local station WWJB. He graduated from Hernando High School in 1975 and attended the Radio Engineering Institute of Sarasota and Pasco–Hernando Community College.

== Career ==
=== Space Ghost ===
Lowe did occasional voice-over work for TBS throughout the late 1980s and early 1990s, as well as occasional voice-overs for Cartoon Network in the mid 1990s. Lowe's career as a voice actor officially began in 1994 with the premiere of Space Ghost Coast to Coast, in which he starred as the lead role of Space Ghost. Space Ghost Coast to Coast finished a ten-year run of new episodes on Cartoon Network/Adult Swim in 2004, and was revived on GameTap for two seasons during 2006–2008 for an additional 16 episodes.

Lowe performed Space Ghost's voice more than any other role in his acting career, and he portrayed the character more often than any other actor (Gary Owens being second and Andy Merrill the third). In addition to Space Ghost Coast to Coast and its spin-off program Cartoon Planet, he made appearances as Space Ghost in Aqua Teen Hunger Force Colon Movie Film for Theaters, The Brak Show (he was also a series regular, providing the voice for Dad), Robot Chicken (among various other characters), Perfect Hair Forever, and other Adult Swim series. As Space Ghost, Lowe served as the voice of the Cartoon Network's merchandise phone sales line.

Lowe performed live and in costume as Space Ghost during the Aqua Teen Hunger Force Colon Movie Film for Theaters premiere webcast for Adult Swim; it can also be found among the extras of the Aqua Teen Hunger Force Volume Five DVD set. Lowe reprised his role as Space Ghost in the 2011 game Cartoon Network: Punch Time Explosion (where Space Ghost is the announcer), but did not voice the character in the 2012 revival of Cartoon Planet.

=== Other roles ===
Lowe recorded dialog for the film Radioland Murders, produced by George Lucas, but his scenes were cut from the final film. Lowe appeared as Dick, the chief executive officer of the fictional Bebop Cola company, in a live-action segment of the Sealab 2021 episode "All That Jazz". He also played the recurring character of himself on Aqua Teen Hunger Force, in which he had a different occupation in every episode; he also played the character "Jet Chicken" on the show. Lowe also provides voices on multiple episodes of Robot Chicken, with his most well-known recurring role being the perverted Unicorn.

Lowe is a recurring character in Artix Entertainment games. Lowe made a special guest voice appearance in the online games AdventureQuest Worlds and Mech Quest for their Friday the 13th events in August 2010, in which he takes the role of a park ranger who tells stories around campfires – but is eventually revealed to be a spirit that feeds on fear. Lowe further appears in Mech Quest as GLaDERP, a parody of GLaDOS from Portal. Lowe narrated the AQW second-year birthday event, and also made a special guest voice appearance in the online game DragonFable for the Falconreach Idle event in November 2010; he voiced himself in a panel of three judges for the event. In December 2010, as part of the game's one-year anniversary event, George Lowe, as himself, became a fightable NPC in EpicDuel, Artix Entertainment's PvP MMO.

Lowe did voice-over work for various media outlets and other companies. For example, San Francisco Bay Area active rock station KSAN uses Lowe's voice in station identification spots. He also did voiceovers for Cleveland rock station WNCX, the Fox, FX, and FXX television networks, and commercials for Dunkin' Donuts and Capital One.

Lowe was among the event guests in the MMORPG AdventureQuest Worlds. He did announcing work for Sponsors vs. Freeloaders from the second episode forward, and was the announcer for The B.S. of A. with Brian Sack.

Lowe could be heard introducing and closing each episode of Adult Swim Central Central Presents Colon Adult Swim Swimcast Intended for the Internet (the Swimcast).

== Illness and death ==
In July 2023, it was reported that Lowe was recovering from health issues at his Florida home. He died therefore in Lakeland, Florida, on March 2, 2025, at the age of 67, while recovering from a heart surgery procedure he underwent in November. He was inactive on social media for over a year prior to his death.

== Filmography ==
=== Film ===
Year	Title	Role	Notes
1994	Radioland Murders	Radio Announcer	Uncredited
2007	Aqua Teen Hunger Force Colon Movie Film for Theaters	Space Ghost	

=== Television ===
Year	Title	Role	Notes
1994–2008	Space Ghost Coast to Coast	Tad Ghostal / Space Ghost, Various	Appeared in all 110 episodes in all 10 seasons
1997–98	Cartoon Planet	Space Ghost	
1997	Dinner and a Movie	Space Ghost	Ep. "Spaceballs"
1998	Donny & Marie	Space Ghost	Episode aired November 15, 1998
2000	Celebrity Deathmatch	Willard Scott	Ep. "Turn on Your TV Day"
2000	Brak Presents the Brak Show Starring Brak	Various	
2000–03	The Brak Show	Dad, Space Ghost, Announcer	
2001	Sealab 2021	Dick	Ep. "All That Jazz"
2002–15	Aqua Teen Hunger Force	Himself, Police Officer, Jet Chicken, Various	
2004–14	Perfect Hair Forever	Space Ghost, Japanese Corporate TV Executive, Various	
2006–22	Robot Chicken	Unicorn, Various Voices	
2008	Assy McGee	Coroner, Doctor	
2009–10	Squidbillies	Wrestling Promo Announcer	
2011	The B.S. of A. with Brian Sack	Various	
2017	American Dad!	Cyrus Mooney	Ep. "The Long Bomb"
2020	12 oz. Mouse	Muff	Ep. "First 12"
2024–25	Jellystone!	Space Ghost	Eps. "Space Con", "Kabong Along with Me"; final voice role

=== Video games ===
Year	Title	Role	Notes
1998	How Zorak Stole X-Mas	Space Ghost	Uncredited
2000	The Grinch	Narrator	Uncredited
2010	AdventureQuest Worlds	Himself	
2010	MechQuest	Himself	
2011	Cartoon Network: Punch Time Explosion	Announcer, Space Ghost	

Preceded by Andy Merrill	Actors portraying Space Ghost; 1994–2025	Succeeded by Paul F. Tompkins
