= Death from Above =

Death From Above may refer to:

In music:

- Death from Above 1979, a Canadian rock duo
- The DJ nickname of musician James Murphy
- Death From Above Records, renamed DFA Records
- "Let's Make Love and Listen to Death from Above", a song by Brazilian band Cansei de Ser Sexy
- "Death from Above", a song on the b-side of "Tarantula" (The Smashing Pumpkins song)
- "Death from Above", a song from Thrice's 2016 album To Be Everywhere Is to Be Nowhere

Other:

- Death From Above (MechQuest), an animated short film featured in the web based game MechQuest
- A level in Call Of Duty: Modern Warfare

As mottoes or slogans:

- The motto ("Mors Ab Alto" in Latin) of the USAF 7th Bomb Wing
- The motto painted on the front of Lieutenant Colonel Bill Kilgore's helicopter in the 1979 film Apocalypse Now
- One motto for the United States Army's 82nd Airborne Division
