= DucKon =

Annual science fiction convention (1992–2014)

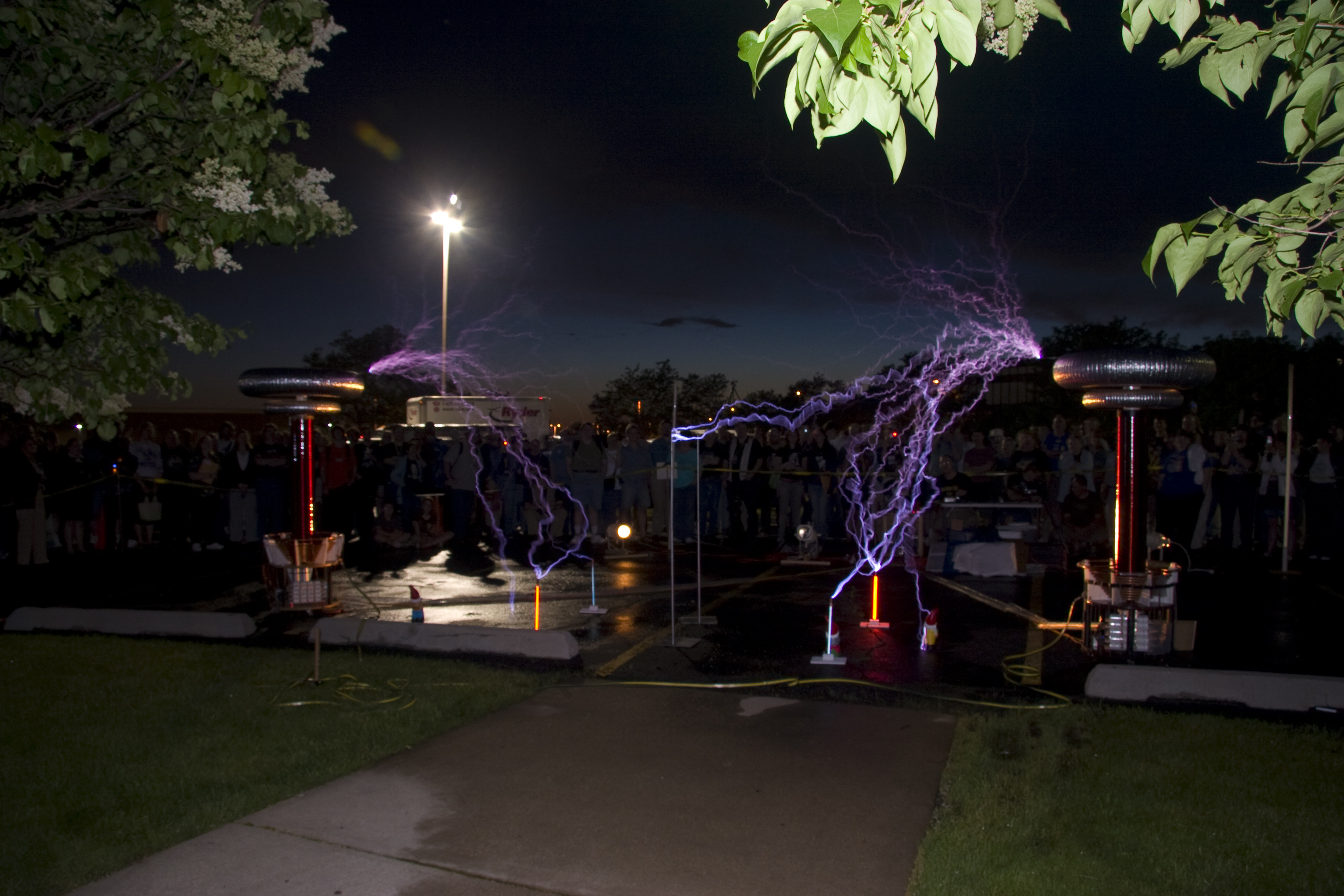
- A pair of Zeusaphones in action during DucKon 17 in June 2008
- Status: Inactive
- Genre: Science fiction/Fantasy
- Location: near Chicago, Illinois
- Country: United States
- Inaugurated: 1992
- Most recent: 2014
- Attendance: circa 600–700
- Organizer: Super-Con-Duck-Tivity
- Filing status: Non-profit
- Website: Official site

DucKon was an annual science fiction convention held every May or June in the Chicago area between 1992 and 2014. The name is a shortening of DUpage County KONvention.

DucKon served as a fundraiser for Super-Con-Duck-Tivity, a non-profit organization known for creating and administering the Golden Duck Awards for excellence in children's science fiction literature.

== History ==
The first DucKon was held in 1992. The first three DucKons were chaired by Candis King. DucKon is known for heavily fannish programming and a strong science track of programming.

DucKon 3 was the first year that the convention had a furry track of programming; that furry track grew over the years and by DucKon 8 was believed to be responsible for up to 1/3 of the attendance. In 2000, most of the furry programming was spun off to become its own convention: Midwest FurFest, although DucKon continued to maintain a furry track of its own.

== Music at DucKon ==
Musical performances were also a feature of DucKon. Songwriter Tom Smith released an album entitled Live at DucKon 2010. Many performances from past DucKons may be seen on YouTube; one, for example, featuring Vixy and Tony with S. J. Tucker and Seanan McGuire. Among many other musicians who have played at DucKon are Maya Bohnhoff, Ookla the Mok, and Michael Longcor.

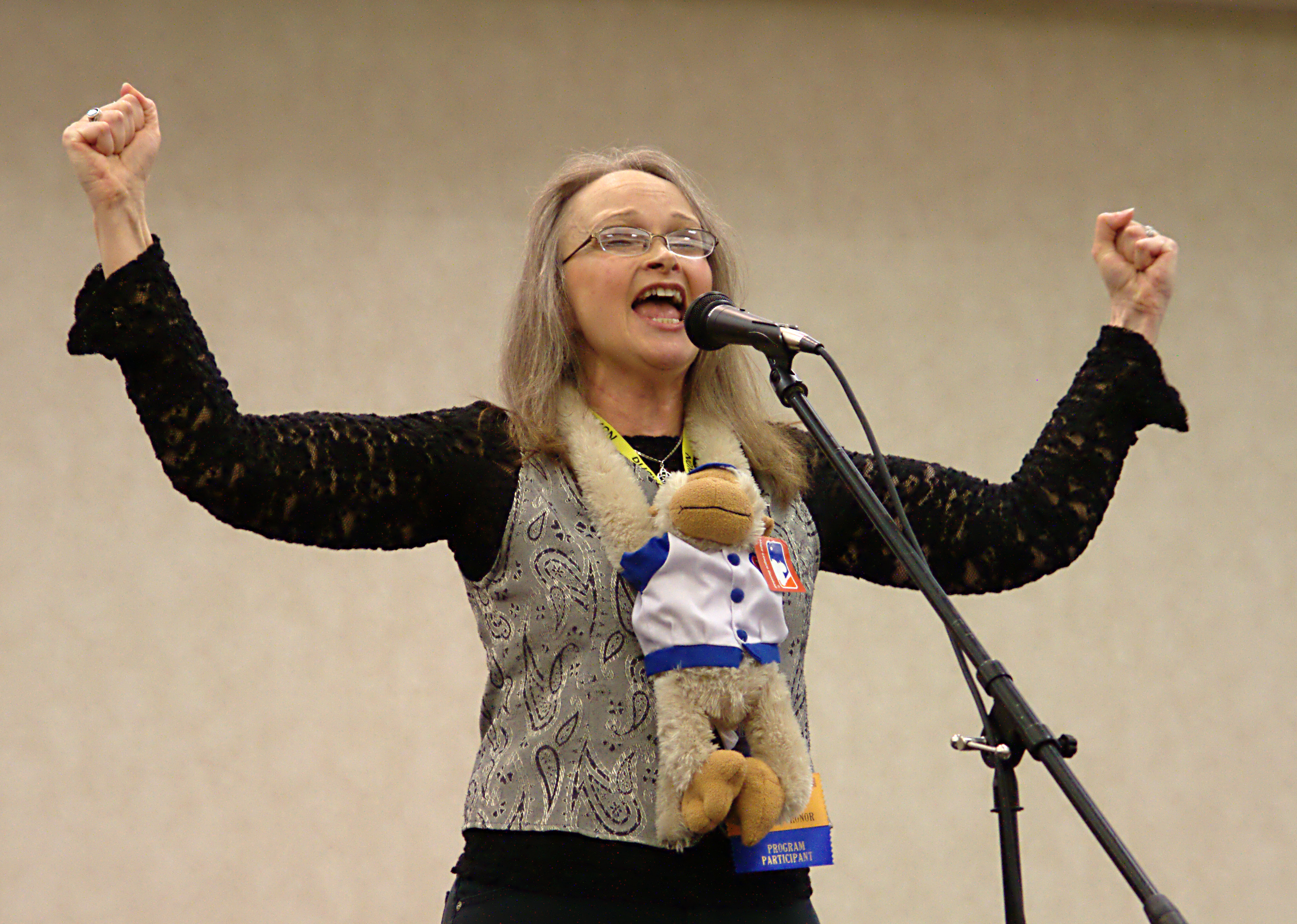
Maya Bohnhoff, performing at DucKon 17 in 2008. Photo by Wikimedia Commons user Beige Alert.

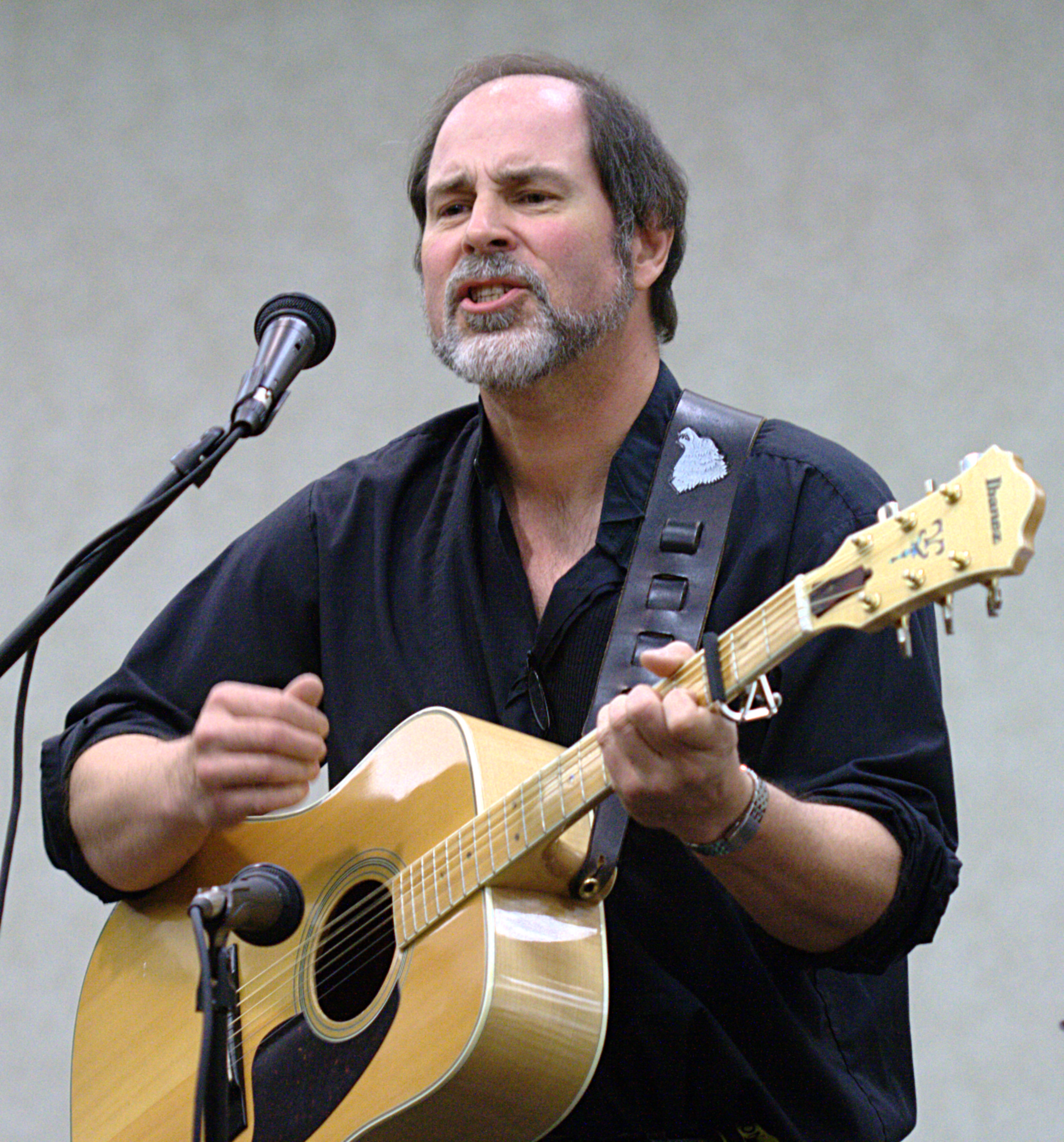
Michael Longcor at DucKon 16 in 2007. Photo by Michael Pereckas.

After the invention of zeusaphones, the convention for several years hosted performances of large musical Tesla coils in the parking lot of its hotel. Video clips of these DucKon concerts garnered over a million hits on YouTube.

== List of DucKons ==
- The 1st DucKon was held in June 1992. Guests of honor included Author GoH Lois Tilton, Artist GoH Mary Lynn Skirvin Johnson, Fan GoH Diane Johnson and Mad Scientist GoH Todd Johnson.
- The 2nd DucKon was held in June 1993. Guests of honor included Author GoH Leo Frankowski, Artist GoH Paul MacNerland, Mad Scientist GoHs Bill Higgins and Barry Gehm, Gopher Danielle Ostach and Fan GoH Jamie McDavid.
- The 3rd DucKon was held in June 1994. Guests of honor included Author GoH C. J. Cherryh, Artist GoH Edwin Reck, Mad Scientist GoH Guy Wicker, Fan GoH Cameron Price and Filk GoHs Carol & Clif Flynt.
- The 4th DucKon was held in June 1995. Guests of honor included Author GoH Jody Lynn Nye, Artist GoH Susan Van Camp, Mad Scientist GoH Tullio Proni, Filk GoHs Carol & Nate Bucklin and Fan GoH Robin Winsauer
- The 5th DucKon was held in June 1996. Guests of honor included Author GoH Hal Clement, Artist GoH Doug Rice, Mad Scientist GoH Dermot Dobson, Filk GoHs Bill & Gretchen Roper, Golden Duck GoH Todd Cameron Hamilton and Fan GoH Paul "Kookie" Mason.
- The 6th DucKon was held in June 1997. Guests of honor included Author GoH Bruce Bethke, Artist GoH Erin McKee, Mad Scientist GoH Cap'n Al Duester, Filk GoH Frank Hayes and Fan GoH Angela Karash.
- The 7th DucKon was held in June 1998. Guests of honor included Author GoH Glen Cook, Artist GoH David Lee Anderson, Furry GoH Terrie Smith, Mad Scientist GoHs Dave Ifversen & Angela Karash, Filk GoH Pete Grubbs, Costuming GoHs Nora & Bruce Mai and Fan GoH Kevin Nickerson.
- The 8th DucKon was held in June 1999. Guests of honor included Special Guest: Frederik Pohl, Artist GoH Ellisa Hawke Mitchell, Author GoH Gene Wolfe, Fan GoH Richard A. Sheaves-Bein, Filk GoHs Graham and Gordon Leathers, Furry GoH Jymn Magon, Golden Duck GoH Hal Clement, Mad Scientist GoH Steve Collins, Roast Master Algis Budrys, Spit Turner Elizabeth Anne Hull and Master Carver Barry B. Longyear
- The 9th DucKon was held in June, 2000. Guests of honor included Author GoH Catherine Asaro, Mad Scientist GoH Brother Guy Consolmagno, S.J., Special Guest Barry B. Longyear, Artist GoH Games Wappel, Golden Duck GoH Larry Segriff, Klingon GoH janSly (aka Dr. Jeremy Cowan), Filk GoH Murry & Kathy Porath, GT Special Guest Charles W. "DC" Nelson and Fan GoH M Devotie Shaw
- The 10th DucKon was held in June, 2001. Guests of honor included Literary GoH Margaret Weis and Don Perrin, Artist GoH Ray Van Tilburg, Mad Scientist GoH Bruce Schneier, Filk GoH Barry Childs-Helton and his sidekick Murray Porath, Fan GoH George Gordon and Golden Duck GoH Hal Clement
- The 11th DucKon was held June 7–9, 2002 was themed "Some Assembly Required." Guests of honor included Literary GoH Joan D. Vinge, Artist GoH Robin Wood, Mad Scientist GoH J.D. "Illiad" Frazer, Filk GoH Dandelion Wine, Furry GoH Dr. Samuel Conway (Uncle Kage), Klingon GoH Admiral q'IDar – known among humans as Suzan Mianowski and Fan GoH Alice Bentley
- The 12th DucKon was held June 6–8, 2003 at "The Purple Hotel." The guest included literary GoH Tanya Huff, Mad Scientist GoH Trace Beaulieu, artist GoH Patricia D. Breeding Black, filk GoHs Bill and Brenda Sutton, fan GoH Jim Rittenhouse and special guests The Great Luke Ski, J.D. "Illiad" Frazer, Dr. Samuel Conway (Uncle Kage) and Nick Pollotta.
- The 13th DucKon, themed "Triskaduckaphobia" was held June 4–6, 2004. Guests of honor included literary GoH Eric Flint, artist GoH Butch Honeck, filk GoH Steve MacDonald and fan GoH Roxanne Meida King.
- The 14th DucKon, themed "I Was a Teenage DucKon!" was held June 10–12, 2005. Guests of honor included Literary GoH Julie Czerneda, Artist GoH Maria J. William, Mad Scientist GoH Dr. Geoffrey A. Landis, Fan GoH Rich "RJ" Johnson, Filk GoH Mary Ellen Wessels and Klingon GoH K'Elvis.
- The 15th DucKon, themed "Beware the Ides of Dvck," was held June 9–11, 2006 at the Holiday Inn Select in Naperville, IL. Guests of honor included literary GoH Jo Walton, artist GoH Theresa Mather, filk GoH Jordin Kare, Klingon GoH Keith R.A. DeCandido, fan GoH Brendan Lonehawk and young fan GoH Laura MaCleod.
- The 16th DucKon, themed "The Duck Side of the Force," was held on June 8–10, 2007. The guests of honor were author Alan Dean Foster, science GoH Jim Plaxco, artist GoH Mike Cole, filk GoH Micheal Moonwulf Longcor, fan GoH Greg Ketter and special guest Laura MacLeod of World Bird Sanctuary. On June 9, 2007, DucKon hosted the first public performance of the Zeusaphone, played by Steve Ward.
- The 17th DucKon, themed "The Maltese DucKon," was held on June 13–15, 2008. The guests of honor were author Elizabeth Bear, musicians Jeff & Maya Bohnhoff, and "mad scientist" GoH Dr. Samuel "Uncle Kage" Conway.
- The 18th DucKon, themed "A Duck Oddity," was held on June 12–14, 2009. The guests of honor were literary GoH Jim Butcher, agent GoH Diana Fox, filk GoH Seanan McGuire, filk fund guests Vixy & Tony, artist GoH Loren Damewood and special guest Sharon Butcher.
- The 19th DucKon, themed "Plan B," was held on June 18–20, 2010. The guests of honor were Literary GoHs Sharon Lee and Steve Miller, artist GoH Jim Humble, filk GoH Talis Kimberley, filk fund guest Scott Snyder, fan GoH Scott Raun and science GoH Dean Mikolajczyk.
- The 20th DucKon, themed "A Tale of Two Duckades" was held on June 17–19, 2011. Guests of honor included Literary Literary GoH Tamora Pierce, Artist GoH: Ursula Vernon, Filk GoH Gary Hanak, Filk Fund Guests Nate and Louie Bucklin, Fan GoHs William and Trudi Puda, Scientist GoHs "The Last Shuttle Team" and Writer GoH Shirley Damsgaard
- The 21st DucKon, themed "Finally Legal," was held on June 1–3, 2012 at Pheasant Run in St. Charles, IL. The guests of honor included author GoH Robert J. Sawyer, filk GoHs The Bedlam Bards, artist GoH Newton Ewell, fan GoHs Anne and Dr. Bob Passovoy, Klingon GoH Keith R.A. DeCandido and science GoH Todd Johnson.
- The 22nd DucKon, themed "Fantasies of the Future," was held on June 28–30, 2013 at the Westin Chicago North Shore in Wheeling, Il. The guests of honor included Literary GoH Tananarive Due, Author GoH Steven Barnes, Science GoH Bill Higgins, Artist GoH Cheryl Storm, and Fan GoH Lee Darrow with Special Guests The Masters of Lightning with Dr.Zeus and their Zeusaphones.
- DucKon 23 was held June 6–8, 2014 at the Westin Chicago North Shore in Wheeling, IL. Guests of honor included Author GoH David Gerrold, Toastmaster Tom Smith, Filk GoH Dan the Bard, Art GoH Jennifer Allen, and Special Non-bipedal Guest Sheila the Tank.

== Hiatus ==
On February 13, 2015, it was announced that the planned 2015 convention ("More Human Than Human") would be cancelled due to 'ongoing financial issues.' Later, the DucKon site announced that the convention would not be held in 2016. No further DucKons have been held.
