= AdventureQuest =

2002 video game

- Developer: Artix Entertainment
- Publisher: Artix Entertainment
- Engine: Adobe Flash
- Platforms: Microsoft Windows, ChromeOS
- Release: WW: October 2002
- Genre: Role-playing
- Mode: Single-player

AdventureQuest (also referred to by its website name BattleOn or abbreviated to AQ) is an online Flash-based single-player role-playing video game started in 2002 and currently developed by Artix Entertainment.

A one-time fee was introduced in 2003, allowing a player to upgrade their character to a Guardian, allowing access to premium in-game content. Ownership of the game transferred to the newly formed Artix Entertainment in 2004, and a server population cap was added for non-Guardian players in May of that year.

In 2005, a microtransaction system was put into place. In response to criticism that server restrictions made logging on for non-paying players difficult, in October 2006 Artix Entertainment introduced a server in which a player could log on at any time, but with a tight level limit. In July 2010, the server cap was removed permanently.

An expansion, WarpForce, was released on July 17, 2009.

== Gameplay ==
AdventureQuest is a single-player RPG, although character data is stored on AE servers. The gameplay is similar to that of traditional RPGs in that it revolves around fighting monsters in a turn-based system. When a player defeats a monster they gain experience points, gold, and rarely Z-Tokens. Both gold and Z-Tokens can both be used to purchase items.

AdventureQuest has an alignment system similar to that of Dungeons & Dragons, which includes selection between Good and Evil as well as Unity and Chaos. Actions taken in game affect the player's alignment, and give the player a selection of custom rewards and access to in-game events. The game also includes equipment that will bestow special effects depending on the player's alignment.

=== Combat mechanics ===
Most fights begin through random encounters and quests, which can be found throughout the game. The battle system is turn-based; on player's turn, they may attack, equip an item (such as a weapon, shield, or armor), use other miscellaneous items, cast a spell, perform a skill (if players are equipped with an item that has a skill), call a pet/guest, or flee from the battle (if the player has enough skill points). Both characters and monsters have elemental and weapon-based resistances and weaknesses. A battle ends once the enemy's HP drops to zero or if the player's HP drops to zero.

=== Events ===
Like many other RPGs, AdventureQuest has special releases or events as well as a limited time shop based on real-life holidays. Holidays include: Snugglefest (Valentine's Day), the Blarney War (St. Patrick's Day), April Fools, Mogloween (Halloween), and Frostval (Christmas). AdventureQuest also includes anniversary events such as The Dragon of Time, Curse of the Phantom Pixel, and Rise of the Shadow Council.

=== Clans ===
The eight clan leaders

In AdventureQuest, players can participate in competitive activities through the clan system. There are eight clans available for players to join, representing the eight elemental realms. Clan bases contain a shop that sells items of its respective element, as well as clan-unique items.

In addition to the in-game leaders of these clans, there are player leaders who are elected on the BattleOn Forums. These players ensure activity and stability for their respective clans and also play larger parts during clan-based game releases.

=== Houses ===
Houses may be purchased with Z-Tokens. Furthermore, players may also use these Z-Tokens to buy pictures and guards to decorate and protect their houses. When a player visits another player's house, they must battle the owner's guards - if any - in order to gain access to that house. Some buildings yield resources, such as health and mana potions, in varying amounts, depending on the quality of the house in question.

== Payment ==
=== Guardianship ===
Guardianship, which can be purchased for a one-time fee of $19.95, gives players access to premium content. This fee goes toward the maintenance of the game and its servers. Guardians can reach a maximum level of 150 while adventurers can reach a maximum level of 135. It also boosts the player's Z-Token count by 1000. Players can also go to more locations in the game that adventurers can't, such as the Guardian Tower. Furthermore, guardians can unlock quests and items that are not for adventurers.

Other exclusives include the ability to create an account for ArchKnight and ZardWars, which are similar side-games that are also developed by Artix Entertainment. Furthermore, players can upgrade to another form of membership known as the X-Guardian, which gives even more in-game advantages, such as faster XP gain.

=== Z-Tokens ===
Z-Token

Introduced in June 2006, Money or Z-Tokens are rare coins in AdventureQuest that are occasionally found after winning a battle. Players may also purchase Z-Tokens with real-world money. Players may use Z-Tokens to buy shields, armor, weapons, pets, and items.

These Z-Token items are usually more powerful than normal items and require a lower player level to be purchased. Players may also purchase inventory slots with Z-Tokens, or trade them for in-game gold. A special shop called the Limited Time Shop offers mostly Z-Token equipment, usually either discounted or soon-to-be rare.

== Critical reception ==
A common criticism of AdventureQuest is that there is little to no player interaction with other players in the game. OMGN praised the graphics, theme and the broad range of quests, events, stories, equipment and monsters. The battle system was considered easy to learn, but not as exciting.

== See also ==
- AdventureQuest Worlds (MMORPG)
- DragonFable
- MechQuest
