= Brian Sack =

American writer and actor (born 1968)

Brian Sack (born 1968) is an American writer and actor. From 2011–2014 he was the host of The B.S. of A. with Brian Sack, a sketch comedy show on TheBlaze television network.

He is the author of three books. In the Event of My Untimely Demise (HarperCollins, 2008) consisted of tongue-in-cheek advice for his new sons. His second book, The B.S. of A.: A Primer in Politics for the Incredibly Disenchanted (Simon & Schuster, 2011), inspired the television show he hosted. His third book, The United States vs. Santa Claus: The Untold Story of the Actual War on Christmas (Simon & Schuster, 2013), was a satire co-authored with B.S. of A. show runner Jack Helmuth.

Sack served as a contributing author to the New York Times bestseller Arguing With Idiots: How to Stop Small Minds and Big Government (Threshold, 2009) as well as Cowards: What Politicians, Radicals, and the Media Refuse to Say (Threshold, 2009).

He has written humor for Radar, The Independent, CRACKED, Glamour and McSweeney's Internet Tendency. His work appears in two Best of McSweeney's compilations, Created In Darkness By Troubled Americans (Vintage, 2005) and Keep Scrolling Till You Feel Something (McSweeney's, 2019).

As a voice talent Sack has appeared in numerous commercials and audiobooks as well as the video game Grand Theft Auto IV.

Sack and musician John Mayer collaborated on a comedy short titled The Paul Reddy Show. The half-hour comedy appears on Mayer's Heavier Things DualDisc. Sack's clueless "Paul Reddy" character was based on PBS mainstay Charlie Rose and peppers Mayer with outlandish and often absurd questions.

== Bibliography ==
Fiction

- The United States vs. Santa Claus: The Untold Story of the Actual War on Christmas (2013), Simon & Schuster. ISBN 978-1476764764

Nonfiction

- The B.S. of A.: A Primer in Politics for the Incredibly Disenchanted (2011), Simon & Schuster. ISBN 978-1-4516-1671-2
- In the Event of My Untimely Demise: 20 Things My Son Needs To Know (2008), HarperCollins. ISBN 978-0-06-137430-2
