= Dirty (One-Eyed Doll album) =

Studio album by One-Eyed Doll
- Released: 14 July 2012
- Genre: Gothic rock, punk
- Length: 41:07
- Label: Self-released
- Producer: Sylvia Massy, Jason Rufuss Sewell

One-Eyed Doll chronology
Break (2010)	Dirty (2012)	Something About A Dragon? (2012)

Dirty is the fourth studio album by gothic rock band One-Eyed Doll. It was released on 14 July 2012 and was the first one where the band went to an outside producer. The album was produced at RadioStar Studios in Weed, CA and mastered in Sweden.

== Track listing ==
All songs written by Kimberly Freeman.

No.	Title	Length
1.	"Plumes of Death"	3:41
2.	"Dirty Man"	4:24
3.	"Envy"	4:50
4.	"Fool Me Once"	5:09
5.	"Weed"	2:20
6.	"Menstrual Case"	2:56
7.	"Liar"	4:11
8.	"Roses"	3:43
9.	"Lonely"	4:46
10.	"Fight"	5:13
11.	"untitled (instrumental)"	3:22

== Personnel ==
Personnel list from oneeyedoll.com.

- Kimberly Freeman: vocals, guitar
- Junior: drums, bass, piano, organ

=== Additional personnel ===
- Ida Moody: opera vocals on track 1
- Mr. Swimmy Socks: banjo on track 5
- W. James Steck II: bass on tracks 1, 2, 7, 8 & 10
