= The B.S. of A. with Brian Sack =

American sketch comedy television series (2011–2019)

- Genre: Sketch comedy; Satire
- Created by: Brian Sack; Jack Helmuth
- Written by: Brian Sack; Jack Helmuth; Matt Fisher Lauren C. Adams
- Directed by: Angie Morefield Mike McDermott; Sarah Carlson
- Creative director: Jack Helmuth
- Presented by: Brian Sack
- Voices of: George Lowe
- Opening theme: Matt Mangano
- Country of origin: United States

Production
- Executive producers: Joel Cheatwood; Eric Pearce Conway Cliff
- Editor: Robert Arrucci
- Running time: 30 minutes (with commercials)

Original release
- Network: TheBlaze
- Release: November 11, 2011 – 2019

The B.S. of A. with Brian Sack is an American sketch comedy television series that aired on TheBlaze television network. The show premiered on November 11, 2011. The show's name derived from the title of host Brian Sack's book, The B.S. of A.: A Primer in Politics for the Incredibly Disenchanted (Simon & Schuster, 2011),

The show featured comedic sketches interspersed with a "panel of experts" discussing topical news items. The "experts" were improvisational actors often portraying celebrities or absurd characters.

Despite being on a network owned by right-wing pundit Glenn Beck, the show routinely made jokes at the expense of political figures and politics of all party affiliations. Beck told The Daily Beast that he green-lit the show under the condition that Sack not play any political favorites, telling him, "if it deserves to be poked at, poke."

== Cast ==
Jack Helmuth served as show runner and occasional performer. Sack acted as host, writer and performer. All cast members were drawn from the Upright Citizen's Brigade improvisational comedy theater in New York City.

The show regularly featured the voice of George Lowe, best known for his role as the title character in Space Ghost Coast to Coast.

Full-time staff included Lauren Conlin Adams (writer/performer), Jon Bershad (writer), Caitlin Bitzegaio (writer), Matt Fisher (writer/performer) and César Zamora (writer).

The show's roster of regular performers included Anthony Atamanuik, Jeremy Bent, Lydia Hensler, Langan Kingsley, Molly Lloyd, Tim Martin, Michael Nathanson, Ben Rameaka, Emilea Wilson and Sasheer Zamata.

Atamanuik, who did a wide range of impersonations in "The Experts" segment of the show, went on to portray President Donald Trump in The President Show. Zamata later went to Saturday Night Live.

== Themes ==
The show routinely lampooned political figures of the day, including Barack Obama, Sarah Palin, Michael Bloomberg, Newt Gingrich and Hillary Clinton.

Sack had a particular affinity for jokes at the expense of "nanny-state" politics, the Transportation Security Administration, mainstream media malfeasance, and abuses of power by the Executive Branch of the American government.

The show routinely poked fun at Glenn Beck himself. When Beck proposed the creation of a conservative amusement park, Sack responded with a sketch advertising the fictional "Libertypendence Park".

== Popular sketches ==
Fact-Free News Reporting lampoons the mainstream media's tendency to rush to report the news first, at the expense of accuracy. In it, Sack interrupts an interview with Buck Sexton to speculate wildly on a breaking news story.

99 Problems and a Glitch Day One portends to be an interview with an individual responsible for the error-plagued rollout of the Affordable Care Act. When questioned, he reveals that the infrastructure runs on his son's iPad, and that the software was outsourced to "Bosco from Serbia."

Security Theater is an operatic satire of Transportation Security Administration screening procedures.

NSA Funnies makes jokes at the expense of the National Security Agency in a recurring bit that pays homage to Rowan & Martin's Laugh-In.

Video Game Violence is a 1980s-themed parody about the panic over video games.

Moving to Canada mocks individuals who threaten to move to Canada when an election doesn't go their way.

You're Not Hitler is a song Sack sings to one of the Pumpernickel Boulevard puppets who compares the town mayor to Hitler.

== Recurring segments ==
Pumpernickel Boulevard was a parody of the PBS children's program Sesame Street, and one of the most popular recurring segments. In it, Sack contends with a cast of well-meaning but outrageously politically correct, left-wing puppets.

The Experts was a three-person panel of actors hosted by Sack. The actors portrayed celebrities and absurd characters opining on a variety of topical news items. The format often resulted in moments such as Batman arguing in favor of the White House Correspondent's Dinner, Paul McCartney talking about cannibalism, or Adolf Hitler discussing his views on breastfeeding in public.

Patriot Kidz featured Sack as "Liberty the Penguin" and Lauren Adams as a cheerful co-host of a Department of Homeland Security show that encouraged kids to help the government by snitching on parents and neighbors.

The Best Stuff of America featured Matt Fisher ruminating comedically on iconic Americana like mobile homes and baseball.

The Glenn Beck Show Highlight of the Week featured a brief, out-of-context clip from Glenn Beck's own program with the intention of making Beck look ridiculous.

Every show featured a commercial for an Under-the-Table Sponsor. Sponsors paid the show directly, outside of TheBlaze network, in return for an often absurd commercial that they had no creative control over. The commercials frequently ended with the death of staff member Benjamin Korman.
