= Something About a Dragon? =

Something About A Dragon?

Compilation album by One-Eyed Doll
- Released: 1 December 2012
- Genre: Gothic rock, punk
- Length: 35:04
- Label: Self-released
- Producer: Jason Rufuss Sewell

One-Eyed Doll chronology
Dirty (2012)	Something About A Dragon? (2012)	Witches (2015)

Something About A Dragon? is the first compilation album by gothic rock band One-Eyed Doll. It was released on 1 December 2012. The album features some new songs as well as some of Kimberly Freeman's solo work

== Track listing ==
No.	Title	Length
1.	"Mirror Mirror"	4:46
2.	"You're A Vampire"	3:18
3.	"Girl On Convict Hill"	2:07
4.	"Brief Candle"	3:28
5.	"Ponies (Fluffy)" (Kimberly Freeman)	2:28
6.	"Scorpion Death"	3:42
7.	"Break (Live on Beta TV)"	3:12
8.	"Sally" (Kimberly Freeman)	2:36
9.	"Destiny" (Kimberly Freeman)	3:18
10.	"Ponies (Spiky)" (Kimberly Freeman)	2:11
11.	"Battle On!"	3:58

Notes

Tracks 1–3, 11 are new songs
Tracks 4, 6 and 7 have been previously released
Tracks 5, 8–10 are from Kimberly Freeman's solo work

== Personnel ==
Kimberly Freeman
Vocals and Guitar
Junior
Drums, Bass and Synth

Special Guest:

W. James Steck II
Bass on Scorpion Death

Produced and Mixed by Jason Rufuss Sewell
Mastered by Eric Broyhill
Monsterlab Audio
