= Break (One-Eyed Doll album) =

Studio album by One-Eyed Doll
- Released: 20 March 2010
- Genre: Gothic rock, punk
- Length: 45:34
- Label: Self-released
- Producer: Jason Rufuss Sewell

One-Eyed Doll chronology
Monster (2008)	Break (2010)	Dirty (2012)

Break is the third studio album by gothic rock band One-Eyed Doll. It was released on 20 March 2010 and is considered by many One-Eyed Doll's "breakthrough" album. The album is significantly darker than previous releases.

== Track listing ==
No.	Title	Length
1.	"Airplane Man"	2:43
2.	"Beautiful Freak"	2:24
3.	"Murder Ballad"	4:20
4.	"See Jane Run"	4:31
5.	"Cinderblock"	5:37
6.	"Break"	3:09
7.	"Bumble Bee"	3:40
8.	"Redneck Love Song"	2:34
9.	"Murder Suicide"	5:29
10.	"Sucker Fish"	2:41
11.	"New Orleans"	2:32
12.	"Resurrection"	6:01

== Personnel ==
Guitar, Vocals - Kimberly Freeman
Drums, Keys, Bass - Junior (Jason Rufuss Sewell)
