= Singing Tesla coil =

Tesla coil modified to produce musical tones

Video of the Museum of Science (Boston)'s coil

The singing Tesla coil, sometimes called a zeusaphone, thoramin or musical lightning, is a form of plasma speaker. It is a variety of a solid state Tesla coil that has been modified to produce musical tones by modulating its spark output. The resulting pitch is a low fidelity square wave like sound reminiscent of an analog synthesizer. The high-frequency signal acts in effect as a carrier wave; its frequency is significantly above human-audible sound frequencies, so that digital modulation can reproduce a recognizable pitch. The musical tone results directly from the passage of the spark through the air. Because solid-state coil drivers are limited to "on-off" modulation, the sound produced consists of square-like waveforms rather than sinusoidal (though simple chords are possible).

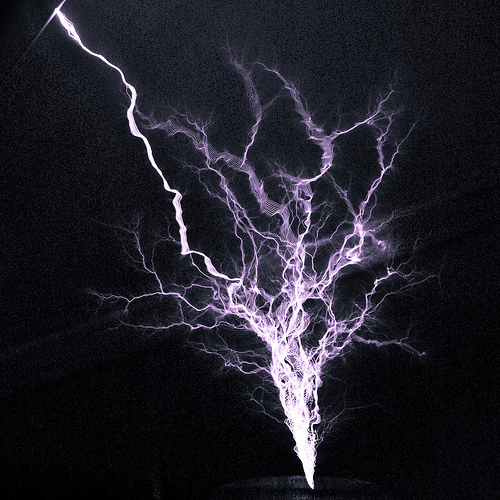
ArcAttack's singing Tesla coil at SXSW, March 14, 2007

The term "singing Tesla coil" was coined by David Nunez, the coordinator of the Austin, Texas chapter of Dorkbot, while describing a musical Tesla coil presentation by Joe DiPrima and Oliver Greaves during DorkBot's 2007 SXSW event. The term was then made popular by a CNET article describing the event. They had been doing public performances with the technology since March 2006. Shortly after that, DiPrima named their performance group "ArcAttack" and became the first musical group to ever use this technology in live performance.

Early versions of musical Tesla coils generally used zero crossing threshold detectors as a method of producing music through their spark output. Scott Coppersmith was the first person to design a complete MIDI-based Tesla coil system.

MIDI is the most common method of music production. It works by means of a microcontroller that is programmed to interpret MIDI data, and output a corresponding Pulse-width modulation (PWM) signal. This PWM signal is coupled to the Tesla coil through a fiber optic cable, and controls when the Tesla coil turns on and off.

== Zeusaphone ==
The name zeusaphone was coined after a public demonstration of the device on June 9, 2007 at DucKon 16, a science fiction convention in Naperville, Illinois. The performance was by Steve Ward, an electrical engineering student at the University of Illinois at Urbana–Champaign, who designed and built the Tesla coil he used. Subsequent performances include "Dance of the Sugar Plum Fairies," performed on September 8, 2007, at the 2007 "Cheesehead Teslathon," a.k.a. "Lightning on the Lawn," in Baraboo WI, by Ward and fellow designer Jeff Larson on matching 41 kHz Tesla coils.

The term "zeusaphone" was conceived by Dr. Barry Gehm, of Lyon College, on June 19, 2007, in a conversation with his friend Bill Higgins. It is a play on the name of the sousaphone, giving homage instead to Zeus, ancient Greek god of lightning. The name was adopted by Ward on June 21, 2007. The alternative name "Thoramin" was suggested by Dan Butler-Ehle; it is a wordplay on "theremin" incorporating the name of Thor, the god of thunder in Norse mythology.

== In popular culture ==
Singing Tesla coils were featured in Walt Disney's 2010 film The Sorcerer's Apprentice.

A singing Tesla coil was used in Björk's 2011 performance piece Biophilia, during a song called "Thunderbolt".

DJ QBert used a turntable for scratching a Tesla coil built by CamDAX (Cameron Mira) at the 2015 Maker Faire near San Francisco

The song "Tesla Theme" in Flux Pavilion's album Tesla features singing Tesla coils.

Progressive metal band Trans-Siberian Orchestra used two singing Tesla coils during the 2019 "Christmas Eve and Other Stories" tour. The Tesla coils were used during the performances of "The Storm/The Mountain", "Requiem (The Fifth)", and the encore reprise of "Christmas Eve/Sarajevo 12/24"

Voltron, the Nikola Tesla-themed rollercoaster in Germany, plays its theme song using singing Tesla coils in the queue line.

W5, the science museum in Belfast, has a singing Tesla coil in its "Energise" exhibition, playing familiar songs like Smoke on the Water, Superman, Star Wars, and more.
