= Hole (One-Eyed Doll album) =

Studio album by One-Eyed Doll
- Released: January 1, 2007
- Genre: Gothic rock, punk
- Length: 55:46
- Label: Self-released
- Producer: Scott Schwartz

One-Eyed Doll chronology
Ghetto Princess (2005)	Hole (2007)	Monster (2008)

Hole is the debut studio album by gothic rock band One-Eyed Doll. It was released on January 1, 2007. Featuring band members Kimberly Freeman on guitar and Scott Sutton on drums.

== Track listing ==
No.	Title	Length
1.	"Suicidal Serenade"	3:26
2.	"Black Forest"	3:28
3.	"Scapegoat"	3:11
4.	"Master"	4:10
5.	"Meth Monster"	4:05
6.	"Hoochie Mamma"	3:11
7.	"Nudie Bar"	2:53
8.	"Tara"	5:35
9.	"Committed"	4:37
10.	"Suicidal Again"	4:03
11.	"I Love My Little Bus"	2:01
12.	"Hole"	6:07
13.	"Recipe 4 Success"	3:55
14.	"Wheels on the Bus"	5:04

== Personnel ==
- Music by Kimberly Freeman
- Guitar, Lyrics and Vocals by Kimberly Freeman
- Drums and Bass by Scott Sutton
- Produced by Jason Rufuss Sewell
- Mastered by Eric Broyhill
