= Babylon Park =

Web parody of South Park and Babylon 5

The cast of Babylon Park

Babylon Park is a spoof of Babylon 5 and South Park that debuted on the internet in 1998, created by Christopher Russo. It presents the Babylon 5 cast with South Park character designs. It spawned several short films, including later productions with actual cast and crew from Babylon 5.

Babylon Park was born from a comment Christopher Russo made on rec.arts.sf.tv.babylon5.moderated: "Oh my God, they killed Koshi!" That comment spawned a website expounding on the joke. Shortly after the debut of that site, Russo was approached by the Atlanta, Georgia-based NicholsFilm group, who desired to make a short fan film based on the concept. Russo granted permission, and Babylon Park: The Movie made its debut at the 1998 DragonCon, along with Russo's own short Spoohunter. The movie portion was written and directed by Alyssa Gobelle, and was an instant hit not only with fans, but with the Babylon 5 cast and crew, many of whom were in attendance at the convention.

After the DragonCon premiere, Russo went forward with plans to make more shorts, but without the involvement of Gobelle or the Nicholsfilm crew. Nicholsfilm would later produce another parody, Crusade Wars, lampooning the network bureaucracy that plagued the Babylon 5 spinoff Crusade.

The later Babylon Park episodes were released by Russo's iNFiNiCorp Transgalactic, and are as follows:

- Episode 000 (1999) – An introductory montage of the Babylon Park universe, showing clips from future "episodes", hosted by Mr. Mordy, the Shadow Poo (a parody of South Park's Mr. Hankey, the Christmas Poo).
- Frightspace (1999) – Extra-dimensional gods invade the station in a Lovecraftian assault, in a parody of the Babylon 5 telefilm Thirdspace. This entry is notable for its voice talent - Babylon 5 actors Wayne Alexander, Robin Atkin Downes, Patricia Tallman, and Jeffrey Willerth lent their voices to the production.
- Spoosade versus Forager: Grudgematch (2000) – Captain Gidiot must battle Captain Painway to determine which franchise's storyline is fit to save Earth from a nanobot plague. This entry was produced by Jeffrey Willerth's Erthbound Entertainment, and won a Silver Trophy in the Animation category at the 2002 Telly Awards. Popular fan songwriter Tom Smith also composed an original song for the film, "Enterprising Man." Babylon 5 actress Maggie Egan joined the cast for this film.
