= Witches (album) =

Studio album by One-Eyed Doll
- Released: 12 March 2015
- Genre: Gothic rock, Gothic metal, punk
- Length: 42:58
- Label: Self-released
- Producer: Jason Rufuss Sewell

One-Eyed Doll chronology
Something About A Dragon? (2012)	Witches (2015)	Something Wicked (2017)

Witches is the fifth studio album by Texan band One-Eyed Doll, released on 12 March 2015. It is a concept album about the Salem Witchcraft Hysteria of 1692.

== Track listing ==
No.	Title	Length
1.	"Ember"	2:31
2.	"Prayer"	3:45
3.	"Black In The Rye"	3:03
4.	"A Rope For Mary"	5:28
5.	"More Weight"	3:26
6.	"Remember"	2:02
7.	"Witch Hunt"	3:21
8.	"Stillness"	5:56
9.	"Afflicted"	6:17
10.	"Sorrow"	0:52
11.	"The Ghosts of Gallows Hill"	6:17

== Personnel ==
Kimberly Freeman
Guitar, Banjo, Vocals
Jason Rufuss Sewell
Drums, Bass, Synths, Organ, Mandolin, Backing Vocals, Ember Sermon
Mastered by Eric Broyhill in Sweden

Special Guests:

Damian Sol
Violin
Alice Giuffreda and Veronica Thorley
Witch Hunt Mob Vocals
