= Monster (One-Eyed Doll album) =

Studio album by One-Eyed Doll
- Released: 15 November 2008
- Genre: Gothic rock, punk
- Length: 44:28
- Label: Self-released
- Producer: David Gilmour

One-Eyed Doll chronology
Hole (2007)	Monster (2008)	Break (2010)

Monster is the second studio album by gothic rock band One-Eyed Doll. It was released on 15 November 2008. The song "PAO!" is sung entirely in Mandarin, a language Freeman is fluent in.

== Track listing ==
No.	Title	Length
1.	"We're One-Eyed Doll"	3:12
2.	"Be My Friend"	3:24
3.	"Brief Candle"	3:30
4.	"UFO"	2:31
5.	"Bulimia"	2:59
6.	"Roses"	4:09
7.	"Plumes of Death"	3:31
8.	"Fight"	5:38
9.	"Pretty Song"	3:50
10.	"PAO!"	2:00
11.	"Monster"	7:06
12.	"Ramblings of the Ungodly"	2:44

== Personnel ==
Guitar, Vocals - Kimberly Freeman
Drums - Paul Evans
