= Tullio Proni =

American psychologist and artist (born 1948)

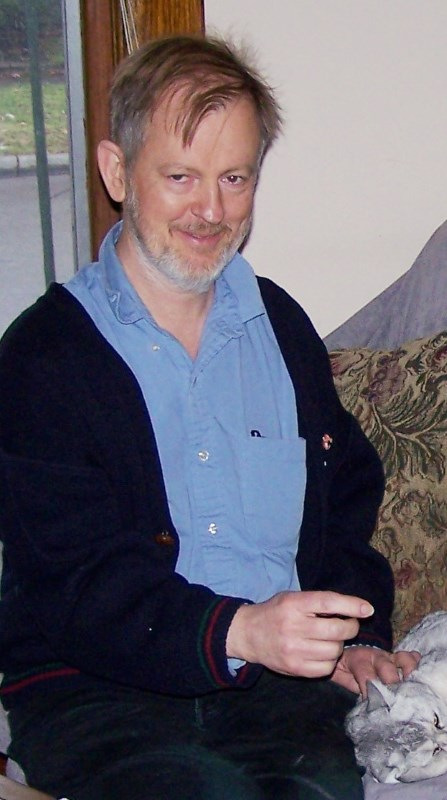
Tullio Proni, psychologist and artist, on 1 January 2007.

Tullio John Proni (born 18 March 1948) is an American psychologist and artist, known for producing ray guns.

== Early life and career ==
Proni, son of Oscar Proni and Maria Zampiera Proni, was born in Monfalcone, Italy. The family emigrated to the United States in June 1954, settling in Broward County, Florida. Tullio Proni attended Nova High School in Davie. He later graduated from the University of Miami and worked briefly for Coulter Electronics in Hialeah, Florida.

Proni moved to Kalamazoo, Michigan for graduate study in experimental psychology at Western Michigan University. There, with his adviser Ronald R. Hutchinson, he participated in a research team investigating the measurement of human anger. Proni undertook thesis work on the response of human subjects to varying rewards of money, receiving a master's degree in psychology in 1973.

He serves as vice president and Information Technology Director at the Foundation for Behavioral Resources, a nonprofit organization based in Augusta, Michigan that operates charter schools and daycare centers, among other activities. With other inventors, he holds a patent on tracking the progress of students through a system of programmed classroom instruction.

== Ray guns and Isher Enterprises ==
In 1976, Proni, a skilled machinist, began fabricating "ray guns" resembling the futuristic handguns in illustrations of science fiction stories. A typical "weapon"—decorative but not functional—was fashioned from polished, transparent acrylic plastic, which acted as a light pipe for a pulsating colored bulb. Batteries and electronics were concealed in opaque parts such as the handgrip. Some models featured audio circuits and speakers to produce an eerie warbling tone.

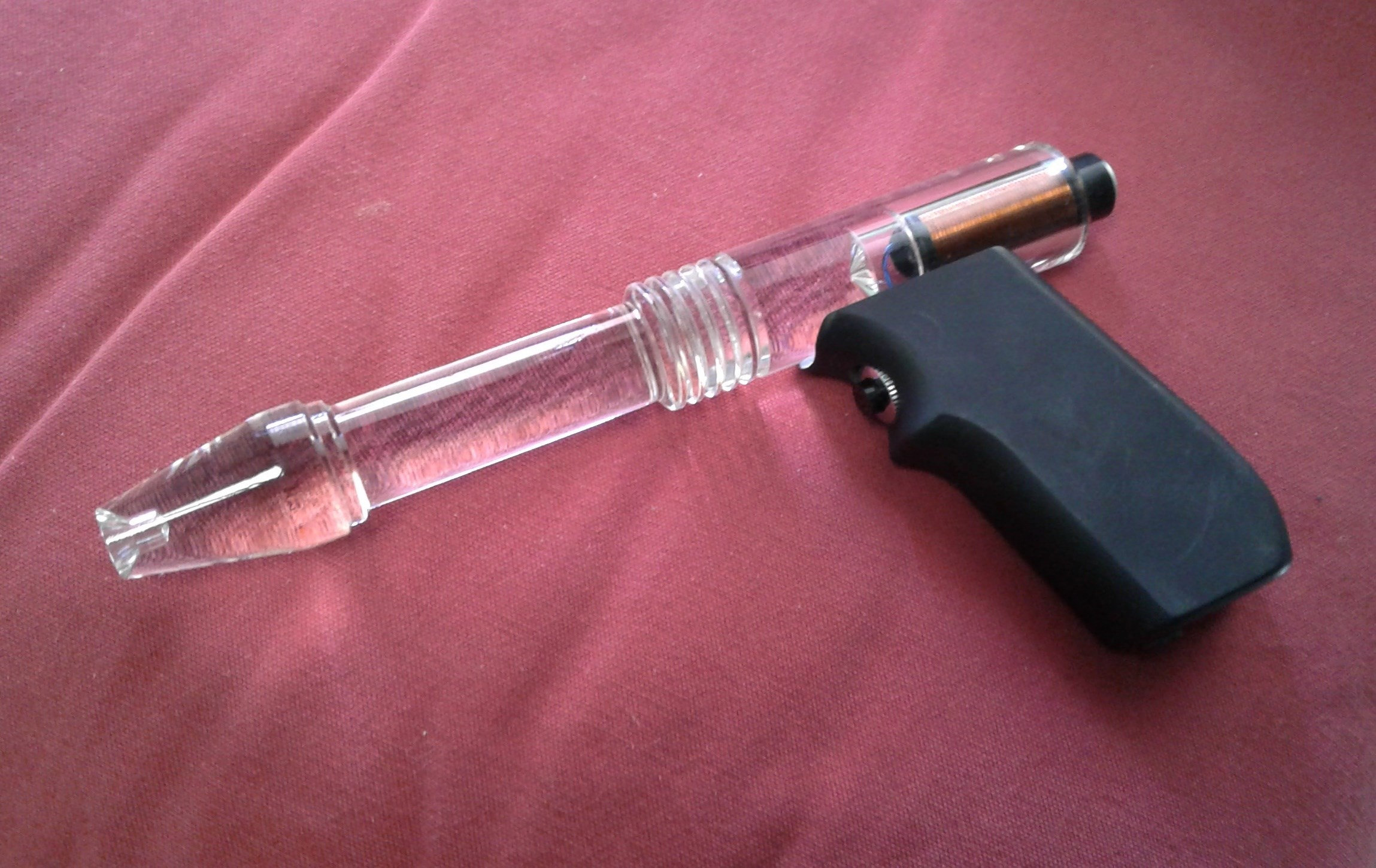
Proni Model B ray gun.

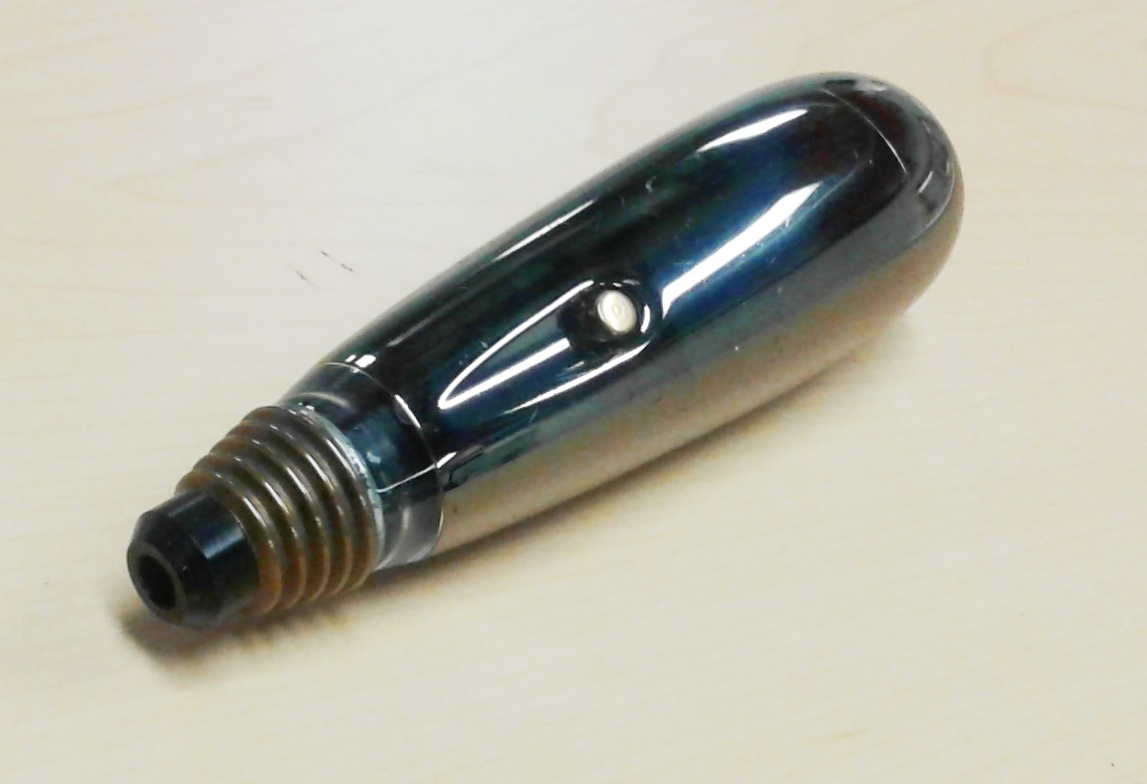
A laser pointer made by Tullio Proni, circa 1995

Proni began attending science fiction conventions, selling these weapons in their dealers' rooms alongside booksellers and jewelry vendors. In time, other members of Proni's household assisted in manufacturing products he designed. Under the name of "Isher Enterprises," his tables offered a variety of products. handguns, larger weapons, and other handmade trinkets with flashing lights or bleeping sounds. He told the Battle Creek Enquirer: "Most of our artifacts are made from acrylic plastic, though we have literally used every material imaginable. Most of the artifacts are handguns which light up and make a ray gun sound. The light shines through the plastic, providing a translucent, icicle effect."

Isher Enterprises took its name from the Weapon Shops of Isher series, science fiction stories by A. E. van Vogt. The business also adopted the motto of the fictional Weapon Shops, "The finest energy weapons in the known universe." In later years, the business adopted the name Isher Artifacts.

The Isher table at conventions became a gathering point for other science fiction fans interested in technology. Proni collaborated on projects such as a remote-control robot fashioned from a cylindrical garbage can with a hemispherical top. With the release of Star Wars in 1977, public interest grew in ray guns and robots. Proni manufactured custom lightsabers. Artist Gordon Carelton said "He also made Artoo Detoo out of garbage cans. He took it to the premiere and got his picture in the papers." In Chicago, Proni was introduced to Star Wars actors Mark Hamill and Harrison Ford, then on a promotional tour.

Isher continued to manufacture science-fictional weapons and props for several years, selling them at conventions and by mail order. Proni frequently introduced new, more sophisticated designs. As Chris Tower wrote in the Kalamazoo Gazette, "In stage one, he designs the gun, often on scraps of paper. In stage two, he figures out the lighting effects, mixing the integrated circuits, diodes, capacitors, resistors, and the like to get the sequencer and other effects to work. For step three, he constructs the body of the gun from aluminum, acrylic, brass, and Delrin [...] Then he tries to fit the circuit in the body casing, often 'an amusing step,' Tullio added."

In 1993, a science fiction convention in the Chicago area, DucKon 4, invited Proni to be its Scientist Guest of Honor.

Proni also co-founded General Technics, an organization of science fiction fans interested in do-it-yourself technology.

== Game designer: War of the Empires ==
In 1966, Proni designed War of the Empires, a play-by-mail space opera game, called by game designer Gary Gygax "possibly the earliest science fiction wargame." Enticing prospective players, he wrote in an advertisement, "Leap into the future and command your own Space Navy! A small group is needed to defend Sol. Send qualifications but remember a good background in S. F. is needed."

Gygax summarized the concept behind the game as "a universe-wide power struggle between two socially hostile groups." On one side was "the Greatest Empire, a monarchy/aristocracy" seeking control of all habitable planets. Opposing them was "the League of All Worlds...a confederation of all planets, systems, and multi-system governmental forms." Human Terrans were enlisted by both sides as they were viewed as "some of the deadliest fighters in the Universe." Proni acted as the "Master Computor" pitting players who choose opposing sides against each other. He would send each player a set of rules for the initial contest along with duplicate copies of a "sector map". The map showed the starting location of solar systems in the sector and starting positions for space ships. Randomly one player was able to choose their starting position with the other player moving first. Players would then move to try and control solar systems whose desirability was determined by "credits" it generated and how many ships it could build. Initially, each side only had a scout ship, but as more systems were claimed they could build more scouts and "torpedoes, cruisers, battleships and fortresses (for system defense, non-mobile)." Each ship had a different move rate, and varied attack and defense modes. Torpedoes had a greater movement speed but could not use hyperspace which allowed triple movement speed but only in a straight line. Players would communicate with one another by mail until the contest was decided. They would then calculate their gains and losses before sending the results to Proni for recording. The winner moved up a rank, and Proni assigned both sides different players who were comparable in rank. Proni strove to publish a newsletter "The War Report" with "News of concluded games, player lists by side, rules comments, sci-fi book reviews, and similar material." Proni dropped the project after only two issues of "The War Report" printed in February and April 1967.

"Science-fiction fans will surely recognize here some trappings of A. E. van Vogt's Isher setting," wrote game historian Jon Peterson in 2018. War of the Empires provides a key example of the sorts of paper-and-pencil campaigns Gygax and others were playing in the years leading up to Dungeons & Dragons." In 1969, Gygax (after several attempts to contact Proni) began a revised version of the game.

Gygax's revised version of Proni's game ended in 1971. Reflecting on the game in 1976, Gygax held that the difficulty with the game was not in its concept or game mechanics but "its total dependence upon the need for a game newsletter to tie the whole effort into a meaningful campaign whole. ...Similarly, the newsletter depended upon players to contribute materials of all sorts - not only about their games and game-related considerations but also about science fiction subjects in general. These contributions kept interest in the campaign and in the magazine at a high level. When publication was erratic, contributions fell off, and game interest was lost. ...If the newsletter could have been maintained regularly the campaign would probably be alive today."

== Science mentor ==
Proni has been involved in encouraging grade school students to explore science, founding an after-school model rocketry program.

== Politics ==
In 2002, Proni ran unsuccessfully as a Libertarian Party candidate for the Kalamazoo County Commission District 3.
