= Tom Smith (filker) =

American singer-songwriter

- Smith at Dragon Con 2026 in Atlanta, GA

Background information
- Born: Ann Arbor, Michigan, U.S.
- Genre: Filk
- Instruments: Guitar, vocals
- Website: www.tomsmithonline.com

Tom Smith is an American singer-songwriter from Ann Arbor, Michigan, who got his start in the filk music community. He is a fourteen-time winner of the Pegasus Award for excellence in filking, including awards for his "A Boy and His Frog", "307 Ale", and "The Return of the King (Uh-huh)", and was inducted into the Filk Hall of Fame in 2005.

== Career ==
His nickname, "The World's Fastest Filker", comes from numerous instances of "instafilk", i.e., quickly-written or improvised songs. He has improvised entire concert sets, and his album Badgers and Gophers and Squirrels Oh My: The 24-Hour Project, inspired by Scott McCloud's 24-Hour Comics Day, features seventeen songs written in twenty-four hours. In May 2006, he released the album The Last Hero on Earth, a comic opera which has twenty songs, all written in one day, to the same plot.

In August 2006, emulating Jonathan Coulton's Thing a Week, he began iTom, a project where he released a new song every week for a year, and continued sporadically after that. So far, he has collected four albums of those songs.

He has parodied Christine Lavin songs with her blessing. He authored the official song for Talk Like a Pirate Day. He wrote "Enterprising Man" for the animated parody video Babylon Park: Grudgematch, as well as the official Transylvania Polygnostic University theme song for the comic Girl Genius by Studio Foglio.

Smith performs frequently at conventions across the United States, and has also performed in Canada and England. He has been featured frequently on Dr. Demento, Public Radio International's Sound & Spirit, and other radio programs. In 2007, he joined with comedy musicians such as Rob Balder, The Great Luke Ski, Sudden Death, Worm Quartet, and others in The FuMP (The Funny Music Project). Smith has appeared in concert with Dr. Demento and on the same bill as Chick Corea.

In 2005, "A Boy and His Frog" was the subject of a mini-arc in the Something Positive webcomic.

On June 7, 2008, Smith tore his quadriceps while attempting to take the stage at a Christine Lavin concert, landing him in the hospital and preventing him from performing for the next few months.

== Discography ==
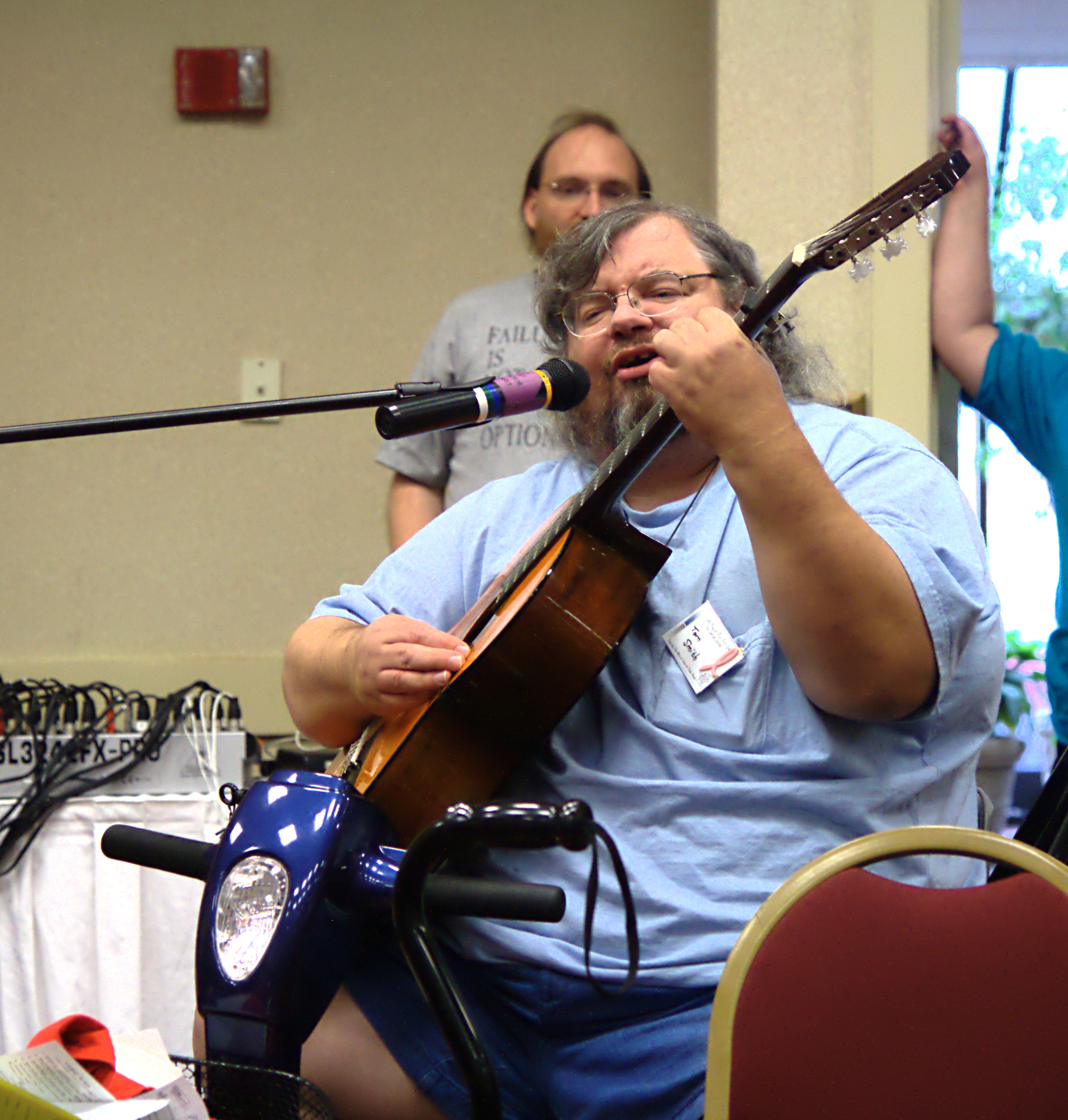
Smith performing in 2008

- Mr. Smith Goes to the Hospital (tribute album), 2008 (download)
- Songs of The FuMP, Vol. 1, 2008 (download)
- iTom 4.0: Smith and Legend, 2007 (download)
- iTom 3.0: True Love Waits, 2007 (download)
- iTom 2.0: Transitions, 2007 (download)
- iTom 1.0: And So It Begins, 2006 (download)
- The Last Hero on Earth, 2006 (CD)
- Sins of Commission, 2006 (download)
- Homecoming: MarCon 2005, 2005 (download)
- And They Say I've Got Talent, 2004 (CD)
- Badgers and Gophers and Squirrels Oh My: The 24-Hour Project, 2004 (download)
- Live at GAFilk, 2004 (download)
- Debasement Tapes, 1999 (CD)
- Plugged, 1997 (CD/cassette)
- Tom Smith and His Digital Acoustic Compilation, 1998 (CD from the two cassettes below)
- Domino Death, 1994 (cassette)
- Who Let Him In Here?, 1991 (cassette)

== Pegasus Awards ==
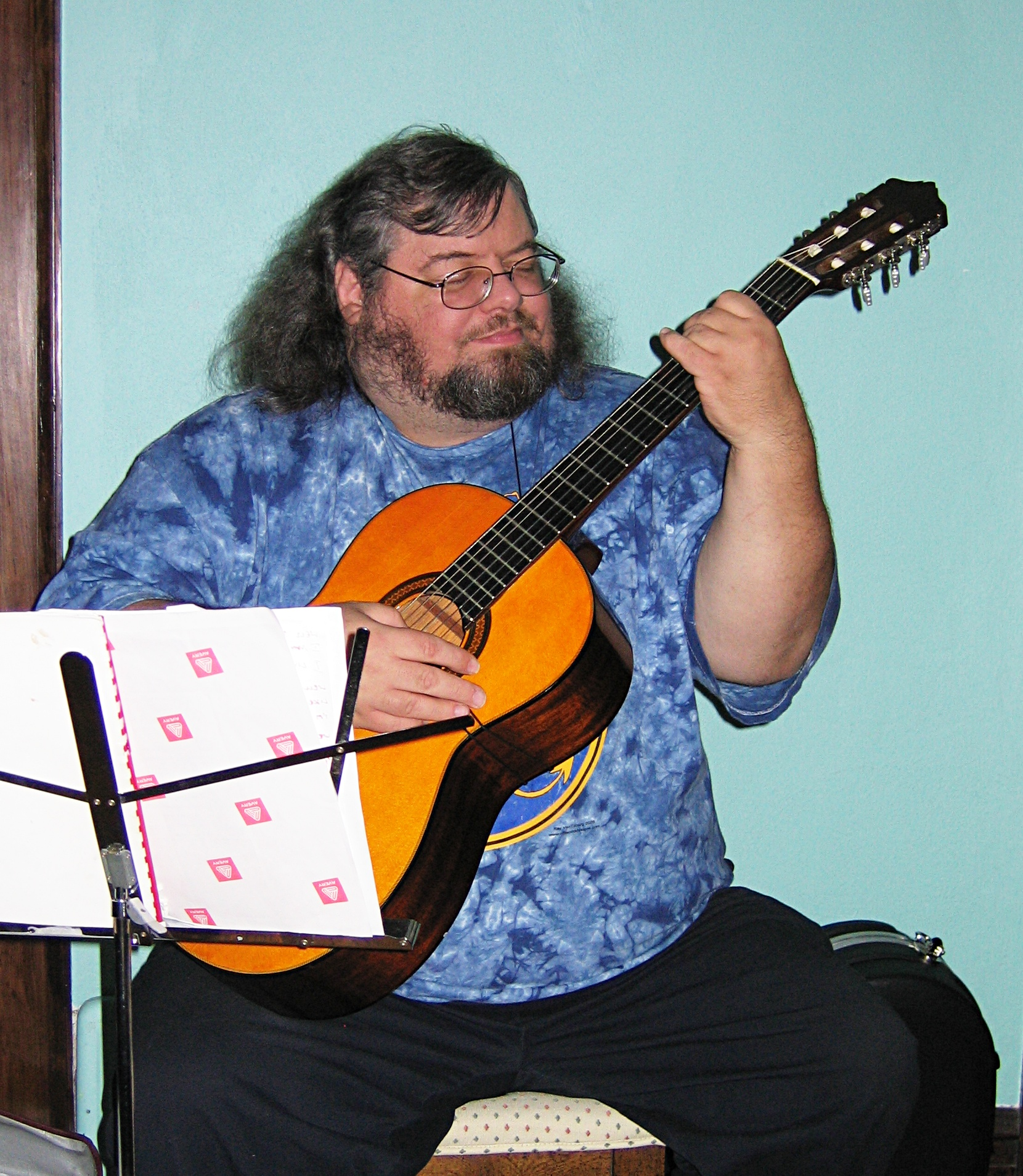
Smith in 2005

- Best Media Song 1988: "Superman's Sex Life Boogie"
- Best Writer/Composer 1991
- Best Performer 1991
- Best Filk Song 1991: "A Boy and His Frog"
- Best Filk Song 1992: "Return of the King"
- Best Performer 1993
- Best Writer/Composer 1994
- Best Filk Song 1994: "PQR (You Ain't Seen Nothing Yet)"
- Best Fool Song 1999: "Operation Desert Storm"
- Best Food/Drink Song 2000: "307 Ale"
- Best Writer/Composer 2005
- Best Filk Song 2005: "Rocket Ride"
- Best Classic Filk Song 2006: "I Want to Be Peter Lorre"
- Best Filk Song 2007: "Rich Fantasy Lives" (in collaboration with Rob Balder)
