= One-Eyed Doll =

American gothic rock band

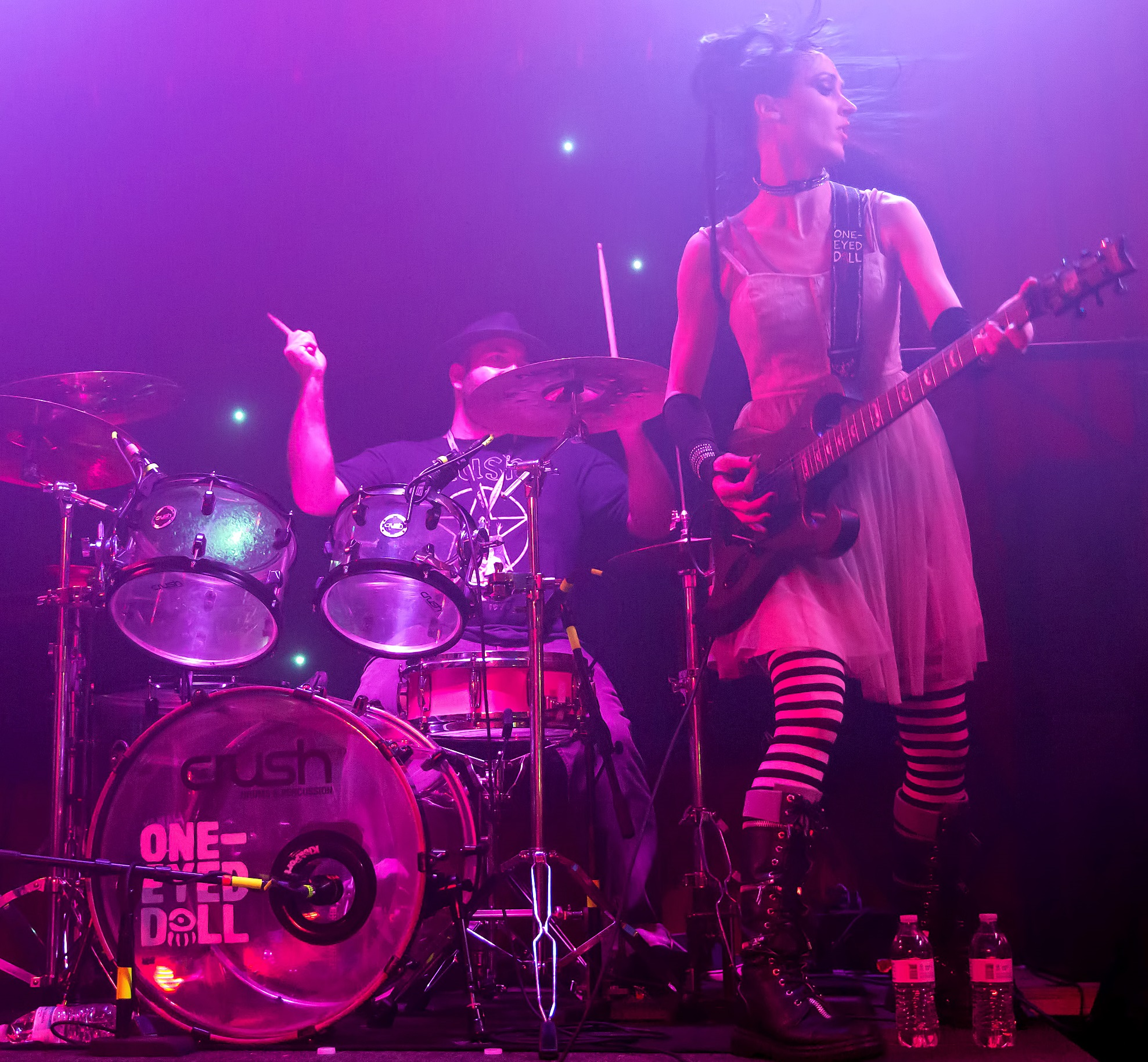
- One-Eyed Doll performing in 2015

Background information
- Origin: Austin, Texas, U.S.
- Genres: Gothic rock; punk rock; heavy metal; hard rock
- Years active: 2006–2018
- Labels: Nebulost Records, StandBy Records
- Members: Kimberly Freeman; Jason Rufuss Sewell a.k.a. "Junior"
- Website: oneeyeddoll.com

One-Eyed Doll was an American gothic rock duo based in Austin, Texas, which was voted the Best Punk Band in 2009, 2010 and 2011 at the Austin Music Awards at SXSW. One-Eyed Doll officially retired on May 21, 2021, after a lengthy hiatus.

With a discography of 11 full-length albums under its belt, (six One-Eyed Doll albums, four Kimberly Freeman solo albums and one under the name Ghetto Princess) the band made No. 1 on ReverbNation's local chart and has toured nationally with OTEP Cold, Wayne Static (of Static X), Peelander Z, Polkadot Cadaver, Wednesday 13, Mushroomhead, and Orgy. The band's lead singer and guitarist, Freeman (who has been described as Gwar meets Strawberry Shortcake) performs on a signature Tregan guitar, accompanied by the lone drummer (and producer) Jason Rufuss Sewell a.k.a. Junior, in a theatrical style which has been described musically as "... Pixies meets Siouxsie meets Hole" and the "bastard laboratory love child of Dresden Dolls meets White Stripes and Marilyn Manson." Lead vocalist Kimberly Freeman was featured as one of Revolver Magazine's Hottest Chicks in Hard Rock in 2011, 2012, and 2015, Guitar Player Magazine's Top 20 Most Extraordinary Guitarists and on America's Got Talent's 2010 Semi-Finals as part of ArcAttack.

== History ==
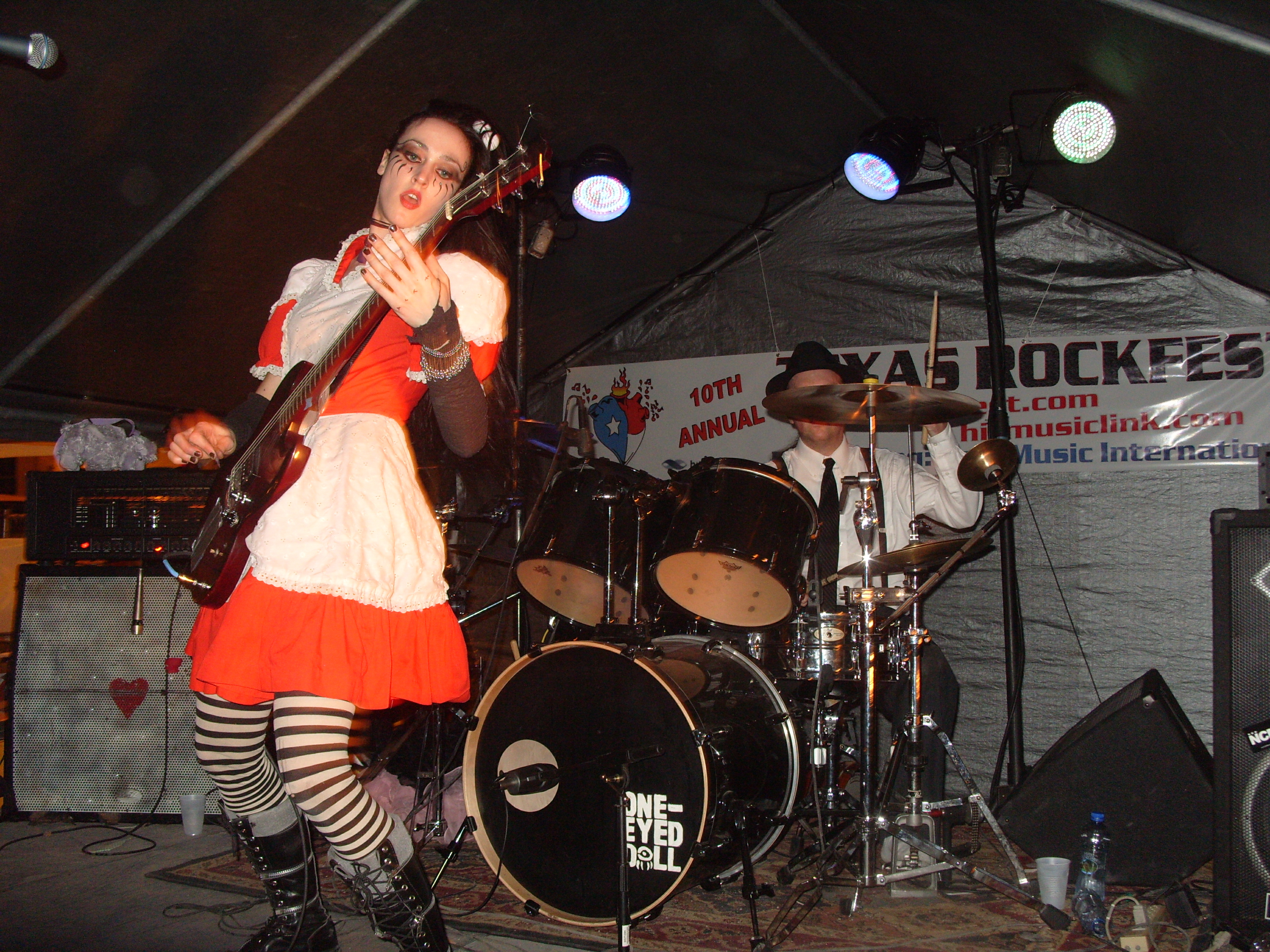
One-Eyed Doll in 2009

One-Eyed Doll, which was formed in 2007, first gained recognition from their peers when they won their first Best Punk Band at the 2009 SXSW; the award was presented by Exene Cervenka of the first-generation punk band X. That year, they also won 2nd place Metal Band, 3rd place Best New Band, 4th place Industrial/Goth Band, 7th place Best Acoustic Guitar (Freeman), 8th place Female Vocals (Freeman), and 10th place Best Record Producer (Sewell, for Monster.) One-Eyed Doll broke into the mainstream media, however, with the release of their third album Break, whereupon Freeman was featured in the January/February 2011 Fallen Heroes issue of Revolver in its cover feature The Hottest Chicks in Hard Rock; she also appeared as an awakening zombie on the America's Got Talent semi finals as part of ArcAttack. She gained musical recognition as a guitarist upon being featured in a full-page dedicated article in the April 2011 Guts & Glitter issue of Guitar Player magazine as one of the Twenty Most Extraordinary Female Guitarists along with the likes of Joan Jett, Bonnie Raitt, and Nancy Wilson. The band has a fervent fanbase, and is known for their mutual support of their fans, some of whom have gotten tattoos of the band's iconography, and for their equally fervent DIY business model. Amongst its national tours, One-Eyed Doll have been performing at several major anime conventions such as DragonCon, and headlining at the 4&20 Blackbird Festival in Weed, California.

One-Eyed Doll's 2012 album, Dirty, was recorded with Grammy Award-winning producer Sylvia Massy (Tool, System of a Down, Red Hot Chili Peppers, Johnny Cash). Dirty was announced by the band in November 2011 on Dark Matter Radio hosted by Jane's Addiction guitarist Dave Navarro. It was reported that the band recorded another album entitled Committed, to be produced by Massy, which would see the light of day in late 2013. The "Committed" video, directed by Patrick Kendall was released exclusively by Revolver Magazine in October 2012. One-Eyed Doll instead went on to release the album "Monster (Remonstered)" in 2013, which Sewell produced. Massy was given a Special Thanks credit on the album.

Freeman is one of several real-life people to appear in the massively multiplayer online role playing game AdventureQuest Worlds, where she is styled as the "True Sixth Lord of Chaos". She also appears in the AdventureQuest Worlds Anything-Goes Battle On Battle Card Game on two cards. She is also the voice of Sally in the Doomwood Saga of the same game.

An hour-and-a-half gonzo documentary of the band's life on the road on tour from Austin to Harlem was released on YouTube by David Bruce Bates, Jr.

== Band members ==
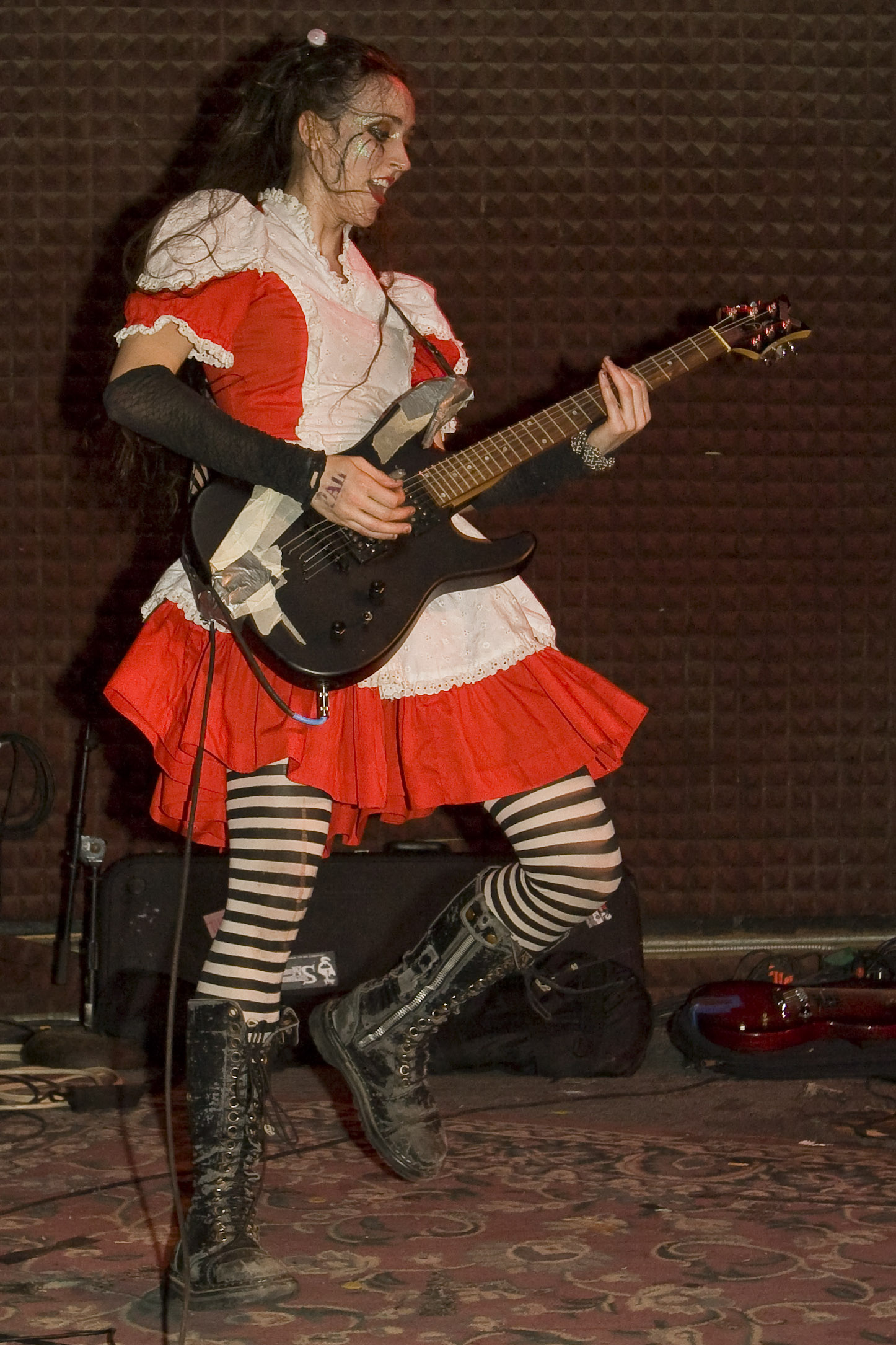
Kimberly Freeman

Former members

- Kimberly Freeman – guitar, theremin, kazoo, vocals
- Jason "Junior" Sewell – drums, guitar, synthesizer, keyboards, vocals
- Paul "PJ" Evans – drums, bass
- Scott Sutton – drums, bass

== Discography ==
=== As One-Eyed Doll ===
Albums

- Hole (2007)
- Monster (2008)
- Break (2010)
- Dirty (2012)
- Monster (Remonstered) (2013)
- Witches (2015)
- Holier (2018)

EPs

- Something Wicked (2017)

Compilation album

- Something About A Dragon? (2012)

=== As Kimberly Freeman ===
- Fat with an "F" (2005)
- Live on South Congress (2008)
- Sleep (2009)
- Into Outer Space (2011)
- Secret Lullaby (2017)
- After the Snow (2021)

=== As Ghetto Princess ===
- Ghetto Princess (2005)
