= Ayi Jihu =

Chinese singer

Ayi Jihu (Chinese: 吉胡阿依; pinyin: Jíhú Āyī; born 1984) is a Chinese singer of Yi ethnicity, signed to British company Shlepp Records.

== Early life ==
Ayi Jihu grew up in Leibo County in the Liangshan Yi Autonomous Prefecture of Sichuan. Dance was one of her early hobbies. Her parents were farmers. Her father died when she was just five or six, leaving Ayi to help her mother with farm chores, mainly raising ducks and chickens. She was exposed to traditional Yi ethnic music and dance from an early age, and found inspiration in the example of Qubi Awu, also an ethnic Yi from Sichuan, whose talents earned her a performance on China Central Television.

In 1994, Jihu's aunt brought her over to London. Her mother, who goes by the English name Cindy, also moved to the UK and remarried to a man named Samuel. She studied in The Leys School for Year 9 in the academic year of 1998-1999 in North B House. In her new country, she came into contact with a variety of musical styles in concerts and clubs she attended with her friends; R&B especially piqued her interest. Though living in the UK, she continued to observe a number of Yi traditions at home, including the Torch Festival.

== Career ==
Ayi Jihu was signed to Shlepp Records in 2007, with whom she released her first album, Try Me. She performed at Macau's Sands Casino in February of that year. In September 2008, she performed at the London Week of Peace concert in Trafalgar Square, singing an R&B song entitled "Winner".

In September 2010, the BBC released an article describing Ayi Jihu's rise to stardom, dubbing her the "Chinese Madonna" and claiming that she had been awarded a gold disc to commemorate 100 million downloads of her album by fans in China. However, a Xinhua News Agency report expressed suspicion of her claims, noting that she did not specify what organisation awarded her the alleged golden disc, and furthermore that the website of her label Shlepp Records did not list any singers under their management besides Ayi Jihu herself.

In April 2011, she was in the "Fear Chaser" Event on AdventureQuest Worlds. This is where the player helps her defeat the Fears of Heights, the Fear of the Dark, and the Fear of Death and even the personification of Fear. Ayi Jihu has been developing the Fear Chaser Chronicles franchise movie property with her manager and producer Stevie Eagle Ellis and independent producer James With. An early treatment has now been developed into a full feature screenplay.

In January 2014, Ayi Jihu embarked on a new series of performances around the world and commenced recording of new songs in London's Battery Studios. A new song from Brazilian artist Edu Casanova with the legendary Tito Jackson has been released. Ayi performed it in Brazil with Edu Casanova.
