= ArcAttack =

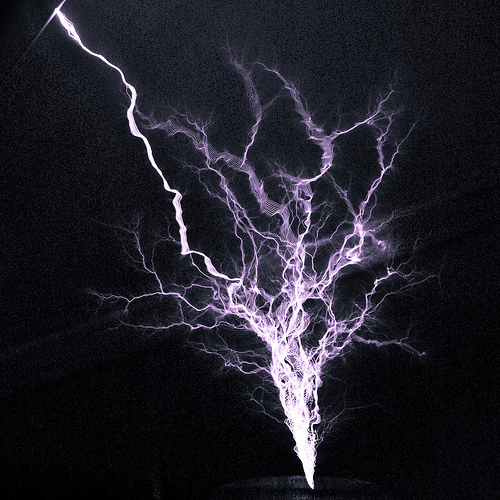
- ArcAttack's singing Tesla coil at SXSW, March 14, 2007

Background information
- Origin: Austin, Texas, United States
- Genres: Rock, Electronic rock
- Instruments: Electric guitar, bass guitar, electricity, drums
- Years active: 2005–present

ArcAttack is a performance art group that specializes in playing music through a combination of homemade, high-tech instruments, and more traditional instruments such as guitar and bass.

== Background ==
The main attraction of their performance is the use of two custom built singing Tesla coils, which have been modified to play musical notes by modulating their spark output. The group also uses a robot drum kit, which is computer controlled via a custom micro controller, that has been programmed to interpret MIDI data and mechanically actuate its drum sticks accordingly.

Aside from the automated musical machines and live performers, ArcAttack also incorporates a stunt man, who MCs the show, and engages the Tesla Coils by walking through the electricity wearing a relatively thin chain mail Faraday suit.

ArcAttack is also featured in the massively multiplayer online role-playing game AdventureQuest Worlds as a band in the game's story "Doomwood Saga".

== History ==
In Austin, Texas, late 2005, Joe DiPrima began developing the first generation of singing Tesla Coils with the help of electronics enthusiast Oliver Greaves, and Steve Ward, a veteran Tesla Coiler from Illinois. The design developed quickly, and after several iterations the instrument reached its present form. In 2007, Craig Newswanger of Resonance Studios provided the performance with another high tech gadget, a robotic drum kit. All the while, friends around the country were helping generate musical content for the new technology to play. In 2007, John DiPrima, the main contributor of original Tesla coil music, moved down from Chicago to help the process evolve further. In January 2008, ArcAttack was finally named. Tony Smith, an old friend of the DiPrima's and a guitarist who had been assisting the group since mid-2006, began helping write music. Later, the group would meet Patrick 'Parsec' Brown, their MC and Faraday Suit stunt man. Another songwriter and old friend, Andrew Mansberger, moved from Seattle to contribute with guitar and keyboards, completing the crew.

== America's Got Talent ==
ArcAttack auditioned for the fifth season of America's Got Talent in Dallas, Texas, Sharon Osbourne buzzed them in the audition because she felt the act was too technical, but they were advanced to the second round Vegas Week. The group featured often in the brief pre-episode "Flashes" that showed some of the acts from that season. On August 3, 2010 ArcAttack performed in the top 48 where they performed the Black Sabbath song, "Iron Man". Osbourne quipped at the time, "The next time you do Iron Man, I know somebody [i.e, her husband] who can sing it for you." The next day it was announced that ArcAttack had come either 4th or 5th in the voting and judges Howie Mandel and Sharon Osbourne sent them through to the semi-finals. Their semifinal performance was highly praised by the three judges, but they acknowledged that viewers at home may not fully appreciate all that is seen on the live stage. Subsequently, ArcAttack was eliminated along with the other three contestants, Kristina Young, Dan Sperry, and Future Funk.

== Electrified: One Million Volts Always On ==
ArcAttack designed the Tesla coils that were used in David Blaine's stunt, which occurred on Pier 54 in New York City during October 2012. ArcAttack was tasked with building an array of 7 tesla coils, which operated continuously over the course of three days. David stood between them on a pedestal, wearing a Faraday suit, without food or sleep. At the conclusion of the event, David claimed that this will be the last endurance stunt that he is to perform.

== COVID-19 pandemic, livestreams and new ways ==
During the COVID-19 pandemic in North America, ArcAttack found themselves with all shows cancelled, for what would have been their busiest year in their existence since 2005.

John and Joe DiPrima quickly set up some of their Tesla coils and show equipment in their own work shop. They started doing weekly live shows on YouTube with episode 3 on May 24, 2020 and going on to episode 11 on August 9, 2020.
