= International Talk Like a Pirate Day =

Parodic holiday created in 1995

- Type: Parodic
- Date: September 19
- Frequency: Annual

International Talk Like a Pirate Day is a parodic holiday created in 1995 by John Baur and Mark Summers of Albany, Oregon, who proclaimed September 19 each year as the day when everyone in the world should talk like a pirate (that is, in English with a stereotypical West Country accent). It has since been adopted by the Pastafarianism movement.

== History ==
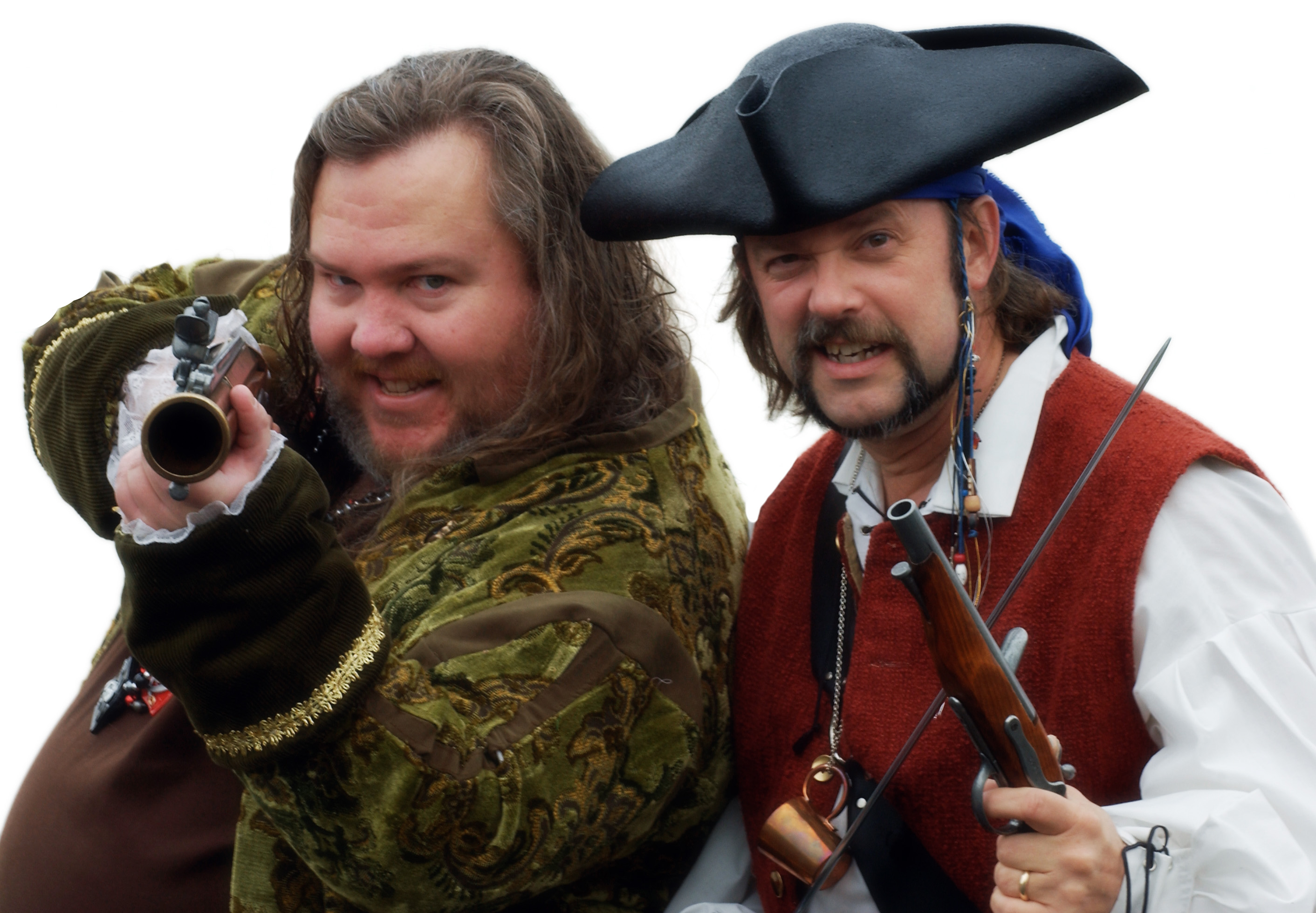
"Cap'n Slappy" and "Ol' Chumbucket", the founders of Talk Like a Pirate Day

The holiday resulted from a sports injury. During a racquetball game between Summers and Baur, one of them, in pain, said, "Aaarrr!" and the idea was born. The game took place on June 6, 1995, but out of respect for the observance of the Normandy landings, they chose Summers's ex-wife's birthday, as it would be easy for him to remember.

At first, an inside joke between two friends, the holiday gained exposure when Baur and Summers sent a letter about their invented holiday to the American syndicated humor columnist Dave Barry in 2002. Barry liked the idea and promoted the day and later appeared in a cameo in their "Drunken Sailor" Sing Along A-Go-Go video. Michigan filk musician Tom Smith wrote the original "Talk Like a Pirate Day" song in 2003.

Talk Like a Pirate Day is celebrated with hidden easter egg features in many games and websites, with Facebook introducing a pirate-translated version of its website on Talk Like a Pirate Day 2008 and publisher O'Reilly discounting books on the R programming language.

In September 2023, The Yorkshire Party, a regional political party in the UK, recognized International Talk Like a Pirate Day to highlight issues faced by coastal communities, including erosion and pollution.

== See also ==
- Tom Scott (presenter), alias "Mad Cap'n Tom", organiser of the British section of Talk Like a Pirate Day (2003–2011)
- List of multinational festivals and holidays
