= MechQuest =

Online flash game

- Logo
- Developer: Artix Entertainment
- Publisher: Artix Entertainment
- Engine: Adobe Flash
- Platform: Microsoft Windows
- Release: October 1, 2007
- Genre: Role-playing
- Mode: Single-player

MechQuest is an online Flash based single-player role-playing video game developed by Artix Entertainment. MechQuest centers on mecha combat and was updated on a weekly basis. Players can play for free or pay a one time fee which grants access to more game content like: a Starship, missions/events, and special Mechas.

== Gameplay ==
MechQuest is a single player RPG, but the character data is stored on a server. Players control their character via pointing and clicking on the screen in various areas to navigate the player character to the point where they click. Most items are activated either simply by running into them, or by pressing a button that will appear when the point is reached (when outside of battle). Battles are presented in two ways, Mecha battles and energy blade battles; both battle styles are similar to a traditional RPG in that much of its game play revolves around fighting enemies in a turn based system. Mecha Battles features a set of many types of attacks but the player must spend energy points to use them.

=== G.E.A.R.S. University Houses ===
G.E.A.R.S. University Houses are groups that the players can join so they can participate in competitive activities. There are three houses available for players to join: house WolfBlade holds G.E.A.R.S. warriors and heroes, house of RuneHawk is a refuge for science and magic alike, and house of MystRaven is for tricksters who enjoy pranks and shenanigans.

== Plot ==
The player controls a mecha pilot from an unknown location. The game begins with the player on a starship heading towards the planet Loreon, where the player will attend G.E.A.R.S. University in Soluna City. After joining the university, the player is educated and trained in the art of mecha and energy blade combat. The player soon discovers an alien empire called the Shadowscythe, who plan to assimilate the entire galaxy, and uses their newly obtained skills to stop the empire's evil plans.

=== Holiday events ===
MechQuest has several recurring holiday events. These include New Years Day, Valentine's Day, April Fools' Day, Halloween (named "Mogloween" in game), Christmas (named Frostval in game), Friday the 13th, Talk Like a Pirate Day and Thanksgiving.

== Critical reception ==
Nic Stransky complimented the graphics and simplicity of the game, but wrote that melee could feel inconsistent and that players may wish for more strategy. MMOHuts praised MechQuest for having a classic RPG-style turn-based combat and plenty of in-game purchasable gear.
