= After Hours =

After Hours or Afterhours may refer to:

== Film and television ==
- After Hours (film), a 1985 black comedy by Martin Scorsese
- After Hours (Canadian TV series), a 1953 variety series
- After Hours (1958 British TV series), a comedy sketch show
- After Hours (Singaporean TV series), a 2007 drama series
- After Hours (2015 British TV series), a comedy-drama series
- After Hours with Daniel, a 2006–2008 American cooking show
- Cracked After Hours, a 2010 web series
- FIFA World Cup on FOX After Hours with James Corden, a 2026 late-night talk show

=== Episodes ===
- "After Hours" (Dawson's Creek), 2002
- "After Hours" (House), 2011
- "After Hours" (The Office) (U.S.), 2012
- "After Hours" (The Penguin), 2024
- "After Hours" (Ugly Betty), 2006
- "The After Hours", an episode of the original The Twilight Zone, 1960
  - "The After Hours" (The Twilight Zone, 1985), a remade version for the revival series, 1986
- "The After Hours" (Severance), 2025

== Music ==
- Afterhour, or AFTRHR, an American rock band formed by former members of There for Tomorrow
- Afterhours (band), an Italian rock band
- After Hours (quartet), the 2018 Barbershop Harmony Society champion quartet
- After Hours (radio show), a 1993–2007 Canadian jazz program

=== Albums ===
- After Hours (André Previn album), 1989
- After Hours (Gary Moore album), 1992
- After Hours (George Duke album), 1998
- After Hours (Glenn Frey album) or the title song, 2012
- After Hours (Hank Crawford album), 1966
- After Hours (Jay McShann album), 1982
- After Hours (Jeanne Lee and Mal Waldron album), 1994
- After Hours (John Pizzarelli album), 1996
- After Hours (Little River Band album), 1976
- After Hours (Pinetop Perkins album), 1988
- After Hours (Rahsaan Patterson album) or the title song, 2004
- After Hours (Richard Holmes album), 1962
- After Hours (Richard Marx album), 2026
- After Hours (1955 Sarah Vaughan album) or the title song
- After Hours (1961 Sarah Vaughan album)
- After Hours (Thad Jones album), 1957
- After Hours (Timeflies album), 2014
- After Hours (The Weeknd album) or the title song (see below), 2020
- After Hours (EP), by Glamour of the Kill, 2014
- After Hours: Forward to Scotland's Past or the title song, by the Battlefield Band, 1987
- After Hours: Unplugged & Rewired, by Digital Summer, 2013
- After Hours with Joe Bushkin, 1951
- After Hours with Miss "D", by Dinah Washington, 1954
- After Hours, featuring Charlie Christian
- After Hours, by Linda Perry, 1999
- After Hours, by Mae Muller, 2019
- After Hours (Live in Paris), by the Bothy Band, 1979
- AfterHours (album), by Mack Wilds, 2017

=== Songs ===
- "After Hours" (Avery Parrish song), 1940; covered by many performers
- "After Hours" (Kehlani song), 2024
- "After Hours" (The Velvet Underground song), 1969
- "After Hours" (We Are Scientists song), 2008
- "After Hours" (The Weeknd song), 2020
- "After Hours", by Adam Lambert from The Original High, 2015
- "After Hours", by the Bluetones from The Singles, 2002
- "After Hours", by the Crystal Method from The Crystal Method, 2014
- "After Hours", by Electric Six from Zodiac, 2010
- "After Hours", by Living Legends from The Gathering, 2008
- "After Hours", by Sea Girls from Midnight Butterflies, 2024
- "Afterhours", by deadmau5 from At Play, 2008
- "Afterhours", by Hurricane #1 from Only the Strongest Will Survive, 1999
- "Afterhours", by Nina Nesbitt, 2019
- "Afterhours", by the Sisters of Mercy from Body and Soul, 1984

== Other uses ==
- After Hours (manga) a 2015–2018 yuri manga by Yuhta Nishio
- After Hours (novel), a 1979 novel by Edwin Torres
- After Hours Formalwear, later MW Tux, a defunct chain of stores, a subsidiary of Tailored Brands

== See also ==
- After-hours trading or extended hours trading, the trading of securities after the stock market has closed
- Afterhours club, a nightclub that is open past the designated curfew closing time for clubs that serve alcohol
