= Joe Bethancourt =

American folk musician (1946–2014)

W.J. "Joe" Bethancourt III (August 8, 1946 – August 28, 2014) was an American multi-genre, multi-instrument musician known chiefly for Americana music.

== Early life ==
Wiltz Joseph "Joe" Bethancourt III was born August 8, 1946, in El Paso, Texas, to Wiltz Joseph Bethancourt and Marcella Inez Burnett. His father was a career Army officer and the family lived on military bases in the United States and Germany. While the family was stationed in North Carolina, Bethancourt began paying more attention to music. His mother played ragtime piano, but he said most of what he heard was Appalachian music. About this time, the family started making annual trips to Arizona to visit his grandfather, who was a fiddle player. It was his grandfather who gave him his first banjo. In a 2003 interview for The Arizona Republic, Bethancourt said, "He not only taught me about Appalachian music, but he started showing me other types of music, like mariachi, which I took to right away."

== Career ==
In 1961, Bethancourt and his family moved to Phoenix, Arizona, where he enrolled as a junior at North High School. In addition to the banjo, he began learning guitar. He listened to mariachi and bluegrass bands. He frequented coffeehouses. With the American folk music revival at its height, Bethancourt's self-taught skills served him well. He started picking guitar and banjo professionally right after high school, playing with Phoenix-area musicians like balladeers Dolan Ellis and Igor Glenn, and bluegrass group, Ma Tucker's String Band.

From 1968 to 1969, Bethancourt worked as a session musician in Los Angeles, where he recorded his first LP, The Joe Bethancourt String Concert Album. The album received a four-star rating from Billboard magazine.

Bethancourt returned to Phoenix, where he hosted "Folk Music Occasional" with Bill Compton on radio KDKB. In the 1980s, he was a regular on the Emmy-winning children's program The Wallace and Ladmo Show on KPHO-TV, where he would play unusual instruments. For 17 years, he was the house band at Funny Fellows, a Phoenix restaurant.

He collected over 100 traditional and non-traditional instruments, 65 of which he could play skillfully. These included not only banjos and guitars, but lutes, Celtic harps, citterns, mandolins, Appalachian mouthbows, and bagpipes. In addition to bluegrass, folk, mariachi, and country, he played Celtic, Middle Eastern, medieval, Baroque and filk music. In the course of his career, he played with John Denver, Carole King, Nitty Gritty Dirt Band, The Dillards, and Doc Watson, among others. Lynn Anderson called Bethancourt a genius in the Summer 2007 issue of The Western Way.

Bethancourt taught banjo, guitar, mandolin and other string instruments out of Boogie Music in Phoenix. He was an artist-in-residence with the Arizona Commission on the Arts, through which he instructed and performed for Arizona schoolchildren. He was nominated for the Arizona Governor's Arts Award, and some of his recordings are preserved in East Tennessee State University's "Archives of Appalachia" collection.

He was a founder of the Arizona chapter of the Society for Creative Anachronism (SCA), and active in historical reenactment through the 9th Cavalry Buffalo Soldiers and the Single Action Shooting Society.

== Final years and death ==
In March 2013, Bethancourt was inducted into the Arizona Music & Entertainment Hall of Fame. He died on August 28, 2014, after a months-long illness. He was 68 years old.

== Discography ==
- That Great Big Way Out There (Random Factors)
- Who Fears the Devil? (Random Factors; inspired by the "Silver John" stories of Manly Wade Wellman)
- Celtic Circle Dance (Random Factors)
- Naked Banjos (Random Factors)
- Ride Back in Time (Random Factors)
- It's About Time (The Bringers; Random Factors)
- Our Fathers of Old (with Leslie Fish; Random Factors)
- Serious Steel (with Leslie Fish; Random Factors)
- Smoked Fish and Friends (Random Factors RF-1004)
- Arizona Road Song (White Tree Productions)
- Old Red Cat (White Tree Productions)
- The Black Book of Locksley (White Tree Productions)
- The Filk Was Great: The Best of ConterPoint 3; Gonglomeration Inc
- 357 Miles East of L.A. (Zia)
- CactusCon Choruses: NASFIC 1987 (WailSongs)
- This Train Is Bound for Glory (Carsten; LCCN 75-751068)
- Arizona Sounds KDKB Vol. 1 (Dwight Karma)
- String Concert (Public; PS 5001)

== See also ==
- Jessi Colter – American country music singer born in Phoenix, Arizona
- Dom Flemons – old-time musician
- The New Christy Minstrels - ensemble folk music group
- Hans Olson – blues musician in Arizona
- Waylon at JD's – debut studio album by Waylon Jennings, recorded in Phoenix, Arizona
