= Frank Gasperik =

American author, writer, songwriter, and filk singer (1942–2007)

- Born: November 5, 1942; United States
- Died: May 3, 2007 (aged 64); United States
- Occupations: Author, writer, songwriter, filk singer
- Writing career
- Genre: Science fiction

Frank Gasperik (November 5, 1942 – May 3, 2007) was an author, writer, songwriter and filk singer.

Frank appeared as a character in several science fiction novels including Lucifer's Hammer (as Mark Czescu), Footfall (as Harry Reddington aka Hairy Red) and Fallen Angels, all by the writing team of Larry Niven and Jerry Pournelle. He maintained a close friendship with Niven and Pournelle throughout their careers, serving as Pournelle's editorial assistant on his Byte column. He also co-wrote a story, "Janesfort War", with Leslie Fish that was published in Pournelle's War World collection, CoDominium: Revolt on War World.
