= Automatics =

English punk rock band

- Origin: England
- Genre: Punk rock
- Years active: 1976–1978, 2000–present
- Label: Island
- Members: Dave Philp
- Past members: Wally Hacon; Bobby Collins; Ricky "Rocket" Goldstein
- Website: theautomatics.co.uk

Automatics are an English punk rock and new wave band that was formed by Dave Philp in 1976 after a brief stint as the singer with The Boys.

== History ==
Along with the Sex Pistols and The Damned, the Automatics regularly played the Marquee Club in London and toured clubs around the U.K. and Europe. Their hit song "When the Tanks Roll Over Poland Again", (released on Island Records in 1978) was number one on the punk/new wave charts. It was one of the first records to be produced by Steve Lillywhite, who was Philp's flatmate at the time, and who went on to produce U2. It is listed at 22 of the top 50 punk songs from that era by Punks Reunited. The Automatics also played gigs with Johnny Thunders and The Heartbreakers and Thunders himself played on the Automatics first album, Walking with the Radio (available through Angel Air, UK). The Automatics toured England with the Vibrators and played the Reading Festival in august 1978. In 1980, Dave Philp moved to California, where he remained lead singer and songwriter for the Automatics but with different players in the band. This early history is recounted in No More Heroes: A Complete History of UK Punk from 1976 to 1980 by the English critic Alex Ogg.

As punk declined in popularity, Philp went into business for himself in Los Angeles, but continued to write, record songs and play small clubs as the Automatics. He was surprised in 2000 when a punk rock record promoter in Tokyo contacted him about releasing his first album and going on tour in Japan. Toshio Iijima of Base Records had Philp play sold-out clubs in Tokyo and Kyoto being backed by Japanese punk musicians who had memorized both the music and lyrics of his first record. The success of that tour led Iijima to bring Philp back to Japan in 2002 and 2004. He also released two more albums: 2 in 2002 and Forty Virgins in the Afterlife in 2004.

The belated rediscovery of Philp led National Public Radio's Ira Glass to conduct an interview with Philp on This American Life. Under "Return to Childhood", Philp is featured in "Act II, Punk in a Grey Flannel Suit".

This radio interview led to his life story being optioned by Hollywood film producers on two occasions. It also prompted one of Philp's earliest supporters, DJ John Peel, to interview him for BBC Radio in London.

The Automatics albums released through Base Records in Japan were produced by Jim Wirt (Incubus, Hoobastank, Fiona Apple, No Doubt and Jack's Mannequin). In 2006, bassist Wirt (formerly of Fool's Face) became a regular member of the band and brought on drummer Paul Crowder (formerly of Eric Burdon, Flogging Molly) and lead guitarist Brian Coffman (Fool's Face).

Wirt, Crowder and Coffman joined Philp to become the Automatics for the 2006 Britannia album, which is a collection of songs about England and Englishness from an expatriate's point of view released on Dork Records UK/U.S. Veteran DJ Mike Read in London invited Philp to tour England playing some of the songs in the summer of 2006 and the single "Old River Thames" went to number one on the Big L/Capital Radio charts in London in January 2007. After the release of Britannia in the U.S. in the spring of 2007, other songs found airplay among independent DJs such as Jonathan_L at KUPD-Phoenix, leading Philp to perform at the South by Southwest event in Austin, Texas. By September 2007, other singles had found airplay including "England Expects", "Who Died and Made You Brian Jones" and "British Beat", which features guitar work by Steve Jones of the Sex Pistols. Though Philp's style has changed and is more oriented to song-writing and less toward pure punk, Britannia still features many of his friends from the punk rock days including Ian McCallum (Stiff Little Fingers), Mick Rossi (Slaughter and The Dogs), and Michael Des Barres (Power Station).

In 2008, Automatics released "Jukebox of Human Sorrow" which is available for download from iTunes. In May 2022, the band reached the Top 10 of Mike Read's Heritage Chart with "Cold Steel Serenade", in a chart which also featured The Vapors and The Boys.

== Original line-up ==
- Dave Philp (vocals)
- Wally Hacon (guitar)
- Bobby Collins (bass guitar)
- Ricky "Rocket" Goldstein (drums)
