= Cause and Effect (Digital Summer album) =

2007 studio album by Digital Summer

Studio album by Digital Summer
- Released: March 8, 2007
- Studio: Minds Eye Digital, Tempe, Arizona
- Genre: Nu metal
- Length: 44:10
- Label: Unsigned
- Producer: Larry Elyea and Digital Summer

Digital Summer chronology
Cause and Effect (2007)	Hollow (2008)

Professional ratings
Review scores
Source	Rating
Melodic.net	4/5 stars

Cause and Effect is the first studio album by alternative metal band Digital Summer. It was released on March 8, 2007, and features the single "Whatever it Takes".

== Track listing ==
No.	Title	Length
1.	"Disconnect"	4:07
2.	"Crash"	3:50
3.	"Suffocate"	3:36
4.	"Now or Never"	3:12
5.	"Broken"	3:42
6.	"One More Day"	3:21
7.	"Chasing Tomorrow"	3:48
8.	"Sick Inside"	3:43
9.	"This Time"	3:58
10.	"Whatever it Takes"	3:32
11.	"Love and Tragedy"	4:25
12.	"SXXXOXXXE"	2:56

== Miscellaneous information ==
- The song, "Whatever It Takes", was played in regular rotation on several major market radio stations, including 98KUPD Phoenix, Arizona, Rock1061 in Savannah, Georgia, Banana 1015 in Flint, Michigan, and Octane 20 on Sirius Satellite Radio.
- The songs, "Disconnect", "Whatever It Takes", and "Suffocate", were featured in the off-road video All Crossed Up.
- "Chasing Tomorrow" was featured in an animation project by Adam Sabo for the Art Institute of Phoenix
- "Suffocate" was used in the soundtrack of the independent horror film Blood Guardian.

== Personnel ==
- Kyle Winterstein – Vocals, guitar, producer
- Ian Winterstein – Guitar
- Johnmark Cenfield – Guitar
- Anthony Hernandez – Bass
- Chris Carlson – Drums
- Larry Elyea, Mind's Eye Digital – producer, engineer
