= Nights with Alice Cooper =

American radio show

- Other names: Alice's Attic with Alice Cooper
- Genre: Classic rock; mainstream rock; comedy
- Running time: 5 hours
- Country of origin: United States
- Language: English
- Home station: KSLX-FM
- Syndicates: United Stations Radio Networks (2004-2023); Superadio Networks (2024-present)
- Starring: Alice Cooper
- Produced by: Katherine Turman
- Recording studio: Phoenix, Arizona
- Original release: 26 January 2004
- Website: alicecooper.com/alicesattic/

Nights with Alice Cooper was a radio show hosted by Detroit born rock and roll artist and shock rock pioneer, Alice Cooper. It was syndicated by United Stations Radio Networks and broadcast on a wide variety of affiliate radio stations in the United States, Canada, the United Kingdom, Australia, New Zealand, Oman, and Europe. The most recent show was being streamed online in a continuous loop by Radionomy, which was also used for the official Nights with Alice Cooper app for iOS and Android. Additionally, it offered "exclusive content" as well as interaction with other fans.

During the program, Cooper played requests as well as his favorite songs (most of which are from the classic rock genre), answered emails from his fans, and interviewed celebrities. Some of the celebrities he has interviewed on his show include Joe Perry of Aerosmith, Brian Johnson of AC/DC, Ozzy Osbourne, Meat Loaf, Rob Zombie, Glenn Danzig, Def Leppard, Peter Frampton and Jerry Springer. The show also plays rare tracks from classic rock artists, along with blues, early punk rock, and psychedelic music.

In 2005, The Guardian described the program as "a distinctive music show... Cooper makes an entertaining host with some unique one-liners".

After a change in network, the show was rebranded as Alice's Attic with Alice Cooper in 2024.

== History ==
The show debuted on January 26, 2004, on 16 stations, including its flagship station, KDKB in Phoenix, Arizona (later moved to sister station KSLX-FM following its switch to alternative rock).

Nights with Alice Cooper features many segments, including "Tuesday Bluesday", "Freaky Facts", "Movie Music Madness", "Cooper's Covers", "Same Name" (two different songs with the same name), "Closet Classic", "The Quiet Room", "Lockdown Rockdown" (songs for Cooper's jailed listeners), "Monster Prog", "Throwback Thursday", "Hey Superstar Clean Out the Garage", "The Best Band You've Never Heard In Your Life" and "Songs We Just Don't Understand". Alice also plays his own rare songs and tells the stories behind them in the "Alice's B.O." (Beyond Obscure) and "Alice's Lost Hits" segments.

Holidays are big events on Nights with Alice Cooper, especially Halloween. The radio show has offered numerous contests and giveaways, including a flyaway trip to see Cooper in concert; a trip to see Led Zeppelin in London; and in October 2008, the giveaway of a signed ESP guitar. Alice is also a huge trivia buff, and gives away signed pairs of his own pants to listeners who correctly answer his questions, which mostly relate to rare rock or movie trivia.

The show is also known for Cooper's humorous self-deprecating one-liner outros to commercial breaks: An announcer often tells Cooper's listeners that they are listening to (among many things) "a man for whom even Dr. Phil has no cure", "a man who is not afraid to look like a fool--and demonstrates so regularly", and, possibly most famously, "a man with a face made for radio", and other things mocking and/or questioning Cooper's intelligence, wisdom, talent, career, activities, looks, etc. in such ways.

In the early days of the show, the program featured several scripted comedy skits which centered around Alice and his life and were written by Kristine "Kiki" Valentine Rakowsky who played Alice's counterpart Mistress Kitty on the show. Many of these featured Alice getting into arguments with rock musicians who asked Cooper for money he allegedly owed them for shows. These arguments would ultimately result in Cooper getting beaten senseless by the artists, who would often yell "and THIS is for making fun of RUSH!" (which was a common joke of Cooper's at the time.)

Nights with Alice Cooper is produced by music journalist and former Rockline producer Katherine Turman.

Nights with Alice Cooper ended its syndicated run on September 8, 2023. Radio and Television Business Report stated that Cooper would be continuing in radio in some form after the show's end but the creative disputes with United Stations, which had changed ownership earlier in the year, prompted him to sever ties with the network. Cooper struck a deal with Superadio Networks to launch Alice's Attic, retaining the same "creative essence," format and staff.

== Affiliates ==
=== United States ===
- KBFX-FM 100.5 FM Anchorage, Alaska
- KROR 101.5 FM Hastings, Nebraska
- KLPX96.1 FM Tucson, Arizona
- WRSW-FM 107.3 FM Warsaw, Indiana
- WRKW 99.1 FM Ebensburg, Pennsylvania
- KKLN 94.1 FM Willmar, Minnesota
- KSLX 100.7 FM Phoenix, Arizona
- WDVT 94.5 FM Rutland, Vermont
- WLKZ 104.9 FM Wolfeboro, New Hampshire
- WCHX 105.5 FM Lewistown, Pennsylvania
- WCBJ 103.7 Campton Kentucky
- WQFX-FM 103.1 FM Jamestown, New York, Russell, Pennsylvania
- WYCR 98.5 FM Harrisburg & Lancaster, Pennsylvania
- KASR 99.3/105.5, Atkins, Arkansas
- KZFX 93.7/107.1 Ridgecrest, California
- KZLE 93.3 FM Batesville, Arkansas
- KLKK103.7 FM Mason City, Iowa
- KVRV 97.7 FMMonte Rio, California
- WZUU 92.5 FM Kalamazoo, Michigan
- WRKY-FM 104.9 FM Hollidaysburg, Pennsylvania
- WMPA 93.1 FM Ferrysburg, Michigan
- WJJH 96.7 FM Ashland, Wisconsin
- KIOO 99.7 FM Porterville, California
- KHEI 107.5 FM Kihei, Hawaii
- KMGI 102.5 FM Pocatello, Idaho
- KKZX 98.9 FM Spokane, Washington
- KRVX 103.1 FM Wimbledon, North Dakota
- WIMZ 103.5 FM Knoxville, Tennessee
- WILZ 104.5 FM Saginaw, Michigan
- KCMQ 96.7 FM Columbia, Missouri
- WWUZ 96.9 Bowling Green, Virginia (Fredericksburg, Virginia)
- WKIT 100.3 FM Bangor, Maine
- KIXA-FM 106.5 FM Lucerne Valley, California
- WGRF 96.9 FM Buffalo, New York
- NWAC 95.7 FM Eunice, New Mexico
- KGGO 94.9 FM Des Moines, Iowa
- KYSC 96.9 FM Fairbanks, Alaska
- WKKN 101.9 FM Westminster, Vermont
- WTHK 100.7 FMWilmington, Vermont
- KSPQ 93.9 FM West Plains, Missouri
- KKZU 101.7 FM Elk City, Oklahoma
- WQRI 94.3 FM (and WRQW, Simulcast Station) — Saegertown, Pennsylvania (simulcast station licensed to Cooperstown, Pennsylvania)
- KOZZ 105.7 FM Reno, Nevada
- WCSX 94.7 FM Detroit, Michigan
- KISM 92.9 FM Bellingham, Washington
- KXPT 97.1 FM Las Vegas, Nevada

=== Canada ===
- CFMK-FM 96.3FM Kingston, Ontario
- CFRQ-FM 104.3FM Halifax, Nova Scotia
- CIXL-FM 91.7FM Welland, Ontario
- CKLY-FM 91.9FM Lindsay, Ontario
- CKLZ-FM 104.7FM Kelowna, British Columbia
- CHOM-FM 97.7FM Montréal, Quebec
- CFMI-FM 101.1 Vancouver, British Columbia

=== United Kingdom ===
- Planet Rock DAB / Sky / Freesat / Virgin Media nationally

=== Australia ===
- Triple M Classic Rock
- 104.1 Territory FM Darwin, Northern Territory
- Crow FM 90.7FM Wondai, Queensland
- Rebel FM (various) Remote New South Wales and Queensland

=== Denmark ===
- MyROCK Nationwide on FM bands

=== Germany ===
- Radio BOB Nationwide DAB+ and in some regions FM

=== New Zealand ===
- The Sound (New Zealand) (various) Nationwide on FM bands

=== Oman ===
- So! Radio 91.4FM
