= Digital Summer =

American alternative metal band

- Origin: Phoenix, Arizona
- Genres: Alternative metal, nu metal
- Years active: 2006 - 2018 - Inactive
- Past members: Kyle Winterstein; Ian Winterstein; Anthony Hernandez; Jon Stephenson; Dan Johnson
- Website: digitalsummer.net

Digital Summer was an American alternative metal band from Phoenix, Arizona, formed in 2006. The band has released three studio albums, Cause and Effect (2007) Counting the Hours (2010) and Breaking Point (2012). Additionally, in 2013, the band released After Hours: Unplugged & Rewired, which contained acoustic reinterpretations of songs from their first three albums. The band has had six singles break into major radio airplay, including multiple charting singles on Active Rock radio, as a completely independent artist.

== History ==
=== Formation and Cause and Effect (2006–2008) ===
Digital Summer was formed in 2006 when vocalist and songwriter Kyle Winterstein and guitarist Ian Winterstein enlisted long time friend and bassist Anthony Hernandez to form the core of the band. After a few months, Digital Summer made the addition of Johnmark Cenfield on lead guitar. The band has had a couple different full-time drummers.

The band's first full length release, Cause and Effect, was released on March 8, 2007. “Whatever It Takes,” was the first single and it spent 45 weeks in rotation on Sirus/XM's Octane 20, and got adds from KUPD, WWBN, WFXH, WPBZ, KXTE, KATT, KILO, KXXR, WZBH, WIIL, Cage Rattle Radio, and more. In addition, "Whatever it Takes" was featured as one of the "Top 4 Songs of the Day" for over six weeks straight on 98KUPD. The second single “Disconnect,” also enjoyed similar success with over 40 national adds, Sirus/XM's Octane 20, WRIF, KSHE, and KUPD included.

An acoustic version of "Whatever it Takes" was featured in KUPD's Acoustic Scorcher album released at Phoenix area Best Buy locations. The sold-out disc included 10 tracks recorded on-site at KUPD's End of Summer Scorcher by artists such as Sevendust, Corey Taylor of Slipknot, Five Finger Death Punch, Tantric, Cavo, and Digital Summer.

The week of May 8, 2008; Digital Summer was the featured cover story for the Phoenix New Times.

Following Cause and Effect, the band released the 2 disc EP/DVD set, Hollow, on March 31, 2008. The DVD portion of the set included a music video for the song "Rescue Me". The full video production included a scene of a car accident and featured both friends and co-workers of the band.

=== Counting the Hours (2009–2010) ===
Digital Summer issued their second full-length album, Counting the Hours, on May 7, 2010. Counting the Hours was recorded in Phoenix with producer Larry Elyea (who previously worked with Jimmy Eat World, Eminem, Adelitas Way), mixed by producer Mike Watts (Dear Hunter, Adelitas Way, Saliva), and features guest performances by Morgan Rose from Sevendust.

The album's first single, "Just Run", was released nationally in early February 2010. In late 2011 the band released the video for "Just Run". The second single, "Hostage", was also released nationally to radio.

=== Breaking Point and acoustic album and inactivity (2011–present) ===
Before beginning work on a third album, Kyle and Ian Winterstein also released music under their experimental rock side project called "Tragedy Machine". They released their debut album titled Pacify on June 7, 2011, which contained the 4 EP tracks they had released in 2008 and 11 brand new tracks. In fall of 2011, Digital Summer announced that it had parted ways with guitarist Johnmark "Fish" Cenfield. After auditions were held, on January 26, 2012 it was announced the band chose Jon Stephenson as their new lead guitarist, who joined the band in time to help with recording and writing their third full-length album.

Digital Summer had a management deal with In De Goot Entertainment/ McGathy who boasts artists such as Chevelle, Sevendust, Saliva, Shinedown, Puddle of Mudd, Adelitas Way, 10 Years, and many more. However, Digital Summer parted ways with in De Goot in December 2011 to operate under their own label, Victim Entertainment.

Digital Summer used online crowd-sourcing platform KickStarter to involve fans directly in helping fund the recording and release of their new album, titledBreaking Point. They produced a promotional video for the campaign, which featured praise from Rick DeJesus of Adelitas Way, C.J. Pierce of Drowning Pool, and Morgan Rose of Sevendust.

Breaking Point was released August 7, 2012. The lead single off the album, "Forget You", which features Clint Lowery from Sevendust, reached #38 on the Active Rock charts. The album debuted at #13 on iTunes in Rock. On September 10, 2012, an official music video for "Forget You" was released. "Dance in the Fire" was also released as a second single, with an official "tour" music video released on 5 March 2013.

The band toured extensively in support of the album. In July 2012, Digital Summer joined hard rock band 12 Stones on the road for a 27-day tour, spanning across the midwest and east coast. In November 2012, Digital Summer went on tour with Taproot for the Winter Riot Tour through the Midwest. In January 2013, Digital Summer went on a 28 dates tour with heavy rock band Nonpoint that covers the Pacific Northwest, Southwest and parts of the South. In late 2012 it was revealed that the band parted ways with drummer Ben Anderson and would be using fill-in drummers for the remainder of the touring year.

Digital Summer was one of RockRevolt Magazine's "Indie Band of the Week" in February 2013. The full length acoustic album titled After Hours: Unplugged & Rewired was released on October 8, 2013. A music video for the track "This City" was released on January 8, 2014.

On January 20, 2014 it was announced that the band would be going separate ways with guitarist Jon Stephenson due to professional differences. Thirteen-year-old Austin Rios was announced to be replacement touring drummer. In January 2014, the band performed at Shiprocked festival alongside such bands as Five Finger Death Punch, Papa Roach, Three Days Grace, Sevendust, In This Moment and Device among others. In April 2014, they did a U.S. national tour with Volbeat and Trivium with 25 dates and multiple one-off festival and headlining dates. In June 2015, Digital Summer had announced that Jon Stephenson has rejoined the band. And that based on the direction of the band, they no longer need drummer Austin Rios and made the addition of RED drummer Dan Johnson.

Between 2016 and 2018, the band made numerous announcements regarding work on a new album tentatively titled "Aquarius" and posted clips of songs that were to feature on it. However, the band has been inactive since 2018, with no further announcements or updates ever being posted.

== Members ==
Current members

- Kyle Winterstein - lead vocals (2006–present)
- Ian Winterstein - guitar (2006–present)
- Anthony Hernandez - bass (2006–present)
- Jon Stephenson - guitar (2012-2014), (2015–present)
- Dan Johnson - drums (2015–present)
- Austin Rios (touring) - drums (2014-present)

Former members

- Johnmark Cenfield - guitar (2006–2011)
- Chris Carlson - drums (2006-2009)
- Ben Anderson - drums (2009–2012)
- Justin Pacy (touring) - drums (2012–2013)

== Discography ==
Albums

- Cause and Effect (2007)
- Counting the Hours (2010)
- Breaking Point (2012)

EPs

- Hollow (2008)

Compilation

- After Hours: Unplugged & Rewired (2013)

Singles

| Year | Title | Album |
|---|---|---|
| 2008 | "Whatever it Takes" | Cause and Effect |
| 2008 | "Suffocate" | Cause and Effect |
| 2008 | "Disconnect" | Cause and Effect |
| 2009 | "Rescue Me" | Hollow |
| 2009 | "Use Me" | Hollow |
| 2010 | "Just Run" | Counting the Hours |
| 2010 | "Hostage" | Counting the Hours |
| 2012-2014 | "Forget You" | Breaking Point |
| 2012-2014 | "Dance in the Fire" | Breaking Point |
| 2012-2014 | "Breaking Point" | Breaking Point |
| 2013 | "This City" | After Hours: Unplugged & Rewired |
| 2015 | "50 Shades" | Aquarius |
| 2018 | "Buried Alive" | Aquarius |
| 2018 | "Push Me" | Aquarius |
| 2018 | "It's No Good" | Aquarius |
| 2018 | "Mayday" | Aquarius |

Music videos

- "Disconnect"
- "Rescue Me"
- "Just Run"
- "Forget You"
- "Dance in the Fire"
- "This City"
