= WMPA =

Currently silent
- Ferrysburg, Michigan; United States
- Frequency: 93.1 MHz
- Branding: Strong Tower Radio

Programming
- Format: Christian radio

Ownership
- Owner: WGHN, Inc, with an LMA to West Central Michigan Media Ministries, dba Strong Tower Radio
- Sister stations: various

History
- First air date: 2012

Technical information
- Licensing authority: FCC
- Facility ID: 189472
- Class: A
- ERP: 6,000 watts
- HAAT: 65 meters (213 ft)
- Transmitter coordinates: 43°03′25″N 86°14′28″W

Links
- Public license information: Public file; LMS
- Webcast: Listen Live
- Website: strongtowerradio.org

WMPA (93.1 FM) is a radio station operating on 93.1 MHz. It is licensed to Ferrysburg, Michigan. It airs a Christian radio format, featuring Christian preaching, lessons, music and assorted educational programming. Programming is provided by Strong Tower Radio, under an agreement with the company that owns WGHN-FM, another Grand Haven, MI-based radio station.

== History ==
On May 25, 2018, WMPA changed their format from country to classic rock, branded as "Classic Rock 93.1". Programming included the "Classic Rock Cafe" weekdays from Noon to 1 and "In The Basement With Jesse Bruce" weekdays 3 to 7pm. WMPA also carried "Nights With Alice Cooper," "Flashback" and "In Concert.". In March 2022, it was indicated that Strong Tower Radio would be providing the programming going forward; this transition finalized on June 10, 2022.

On November 21, 2022, WMPA went silent due to it being evicted from its tower site by the city of Grand Haven.
