= Banned from Argo =

Song by Leslie Fish

from the album Solar Sailors
- Released: 1977
- Genre: Filk, bluegrass
- Songwriter(s): Leslie Fish

"Banned From Argo" is a filk song written and originally recorded by Leslie Fish, released in 1977 on the album Solar Sailors, and later as part of various compilations (Star Trek Comedy: The Unofficial Album; Dr. Demento's Hits From Outer Space, etc.) It won the 2003 Pegasus Award for Best Classic Filk Song.

== Structure and style ==
The song pokes fun at the conventions and characters of the original Star Trek television series. Though no character is mentioned by name, they are identified by their shipboard title/duties and certain characteristics (such as Captain Kirk's sexual escapades or Scotty's taste for alcohol), and are stated to be a Starfleet crew in the final verse. The framework of the song's "story" is the starship crew's stop at "Argo Port" for shore leave, where their antics result in chaos and destruction, prompting the planet's government to ban them from returning, as stated in the chorus:

And we're banned from Argo, every one.
Banned from Argo, just for having a little fun.
We spent a jolly shore leave there for just three days or four,
But Argo doesn't want us anymore.

(The final chorus adds a faux-innocent "Wonder why?" to end the song.)

In the original recording, the song is played in a bluegrass style, with guitars and banjos as the only musical accompaniment. It follows a pattern of single verse followed by single chorus, with an instrumental interlude, the length of one verse and chorus together, between the second-to-last chorus and the final verse. The tune to the single verse is "The Boston Burglar".

The original version of the song prior to recording referenced Klingons in place of pirates in the eighth verse, but was altered for recording. Since pon farr and Starfleet are both mentioned in the recording lyrics, the removal does little to mask the song's origins.

Leslie Fish singing the song at the 2013 Worldcon in San Antonio, Texas

Despite the song's popularity at science fiction conventions, the composer has expressed reluctance to perform the song in public because, for years, she was asked to perform it several times at every Science Fiction convention she attended. Finally she insisted that she would sing it only once a year, usually at WorldCon, NASFiC or DragonCon. In 2013, she agreed to perform the song at the 2013 Worldcon while sitting in a model of the bridge of the USS Enterprise from Star Trek.

== Plotline ==
The crew's escapades in the song include (in order of appearance):

- "The Captain" (James T. Kirk) indulging his sexual appetites with "five partners, each of a different world and sex", requiring an escape by transporter to prevent his arrest by the "shore police".
- The "Engineer" (Montgomery "Scotty" Scott) and "Navigator" (Pavel Chekov) engaging in a drinking contest, with the Engineer winning and the Navigator beating "almost all". The pair then drunkenly leave a shuttlecraft parked on top of a government building.
- The "proper, cool First Officer" (Mr. Spock) being drugged "with something green" and assaulted in an alley, said to have "suffered things obscene". He seems to make a full recovery, but then proceeds to teach the ship's computer to speak profanity.
- "The Head Nurse" (Christine Chapel) acquiring "an odd green potion guaranteed to cause Pon farr", the uncontrollable Vulcan mating urge (a reference to Chapel's romantic interest in Mr. Spock, and quite likely the explanation of what happened to Spock in the previous verse). She returns to the ship happy, but without her uniform and walking in a painful manner "with her feet a yard apart".
- "Our lady of Communications" (Uhura) wins "a shipwide bet" by altering Argo's planetary communication system so that video transmissions viewed on Argo will make all people on the screen appear to be nude.
- The "Doctor" (Leonard "Bones" McCoy) is arrested for "inciting whores to riot", and has to be transported out of jail, "intact except for hickies and six kinds of VD".
- The "Helmsman" (Hikaru Sulu) brings some exotic plants with him on shore leave; the ship later receives a transmission from Argo's planetary governor, who claims that "a gang of plants entwined his house and then seduced his wife".
- When a gang of space pirates (Klingons in some renditions) lands on Argo and witnesses the Starfleet crew at play, the pirates flee the planet rather than attempt to attack or be drawn into the debauchery.
- After the instrumental break, the final verse states the crew's pride for being "Starfleet's finest" and for leaving "a trail a mile wide" when they're on leave. There is also a quick apology to the inhabitants of Argo for the effects of their "play", and a note that Argo won't be forgetting this starship crew anytime soon.

== Further development and derivatives ==
The song is so well known among filkers that its title is commonly abbreviated to "BFA". Once "released into the wild" it was rapidly adopted and expanded upon, with verses referencing various other characters, ships, cultures and so on from the Star Trek universe, with several hundred verses known to have been written worldwide. New verses are performed by inserting them ahead of the final "apologetic" verse (which has always retained its place at the end of the song).

The song has inspired enough filks and parodies to fill two dedicated collections. The Bastard Children of Argo, a collection of parodies, by various authors, published by Random Factors in 2001, contains 78 songs, plus several versions of the original provided by Fish. The Bastard Grandchildren of Argo was issue #83 of the bimonthly filk magazine Xenofilkia, from July 2002, containing 25 songs. There have been other filks and parodies of BFA not contained in these collections.

In 2021, Fish published a novelization of the song on Archive of Our Own, expanding the story behind the lyrics while simultaneously showing how the events were misinterpreted in-story.
