= John Holmberg =

American morning radio host

- Born: 26 July 1972 (age 53)
- Career
- Show: Holmberg's Morning Sickness

John Holmberg (born July 26, 1972) is an American radio personality and host of Holmberg's Morning Sickness. The morning show is on FM rock radio station 97.9 KUPD, which is part of Hubbard Broadcasting.

== Personal life ==
Holmberg graduated from Dobson High School in Mesa, Arizona.

== Career ==
Prior to working at KUPD, Holmberg worked for another radio station, KZON 101.5, as an afternoon DJ. In 2001, Holmberg left KZON 101.5 for KUPD and the Holmberg's Morning Sickness show began. To celebrate the tenth anniversary of the show in 2011, KUPD held a Red, White and UFest concert. In 2011, Holmberg's Morning Sickness won Best Morning Radio Show by the Phoenix New Times.

Holmberg, along with KUPD and the station listeners helped to raise over $13,000 for the Arizona Humane Society to benefit homeless pets. John and KUPD joined forces with Fulton Homes to help shelter dogs find a forever home through the Pick of the Litter Campaign. In 2014, Holmberg and KUPD hosted the inaugural Heat Stroke Open charity golf tournament benefiting the Arizona Humane Society. KUPD and Four Peaks Brewing Co. brewed a craft IPA called Holmberg Bound to benefit the Arizona Humane Society.

Holmberg's Morning Sickness is also a podcast which has earned a global chart rating of #612.
