= Compton Terrace =

Former venue in Phoenix, Arizona

Coordinates: 33.447012°N 111.957577°W

Compton Terrace was a name given to two former outdoor amphitheaters for concerts, located in the Phoenix metropolitan area of Arizona. It was named in honor of a local radio personality and music promoter, William Edward "Bill" Compton.

== History ==
Compton Terrace was an amphitheater owned by Jess Nicks, father of musician Stevie Nicks, in Tempe, Arizona, on the grounds of the Legend City amusement park, and opened in 1979. Nicks chose the amphitheater's name in honor of the late William Edward Compton, a local disc jockey renown for pioneering free-form radio at stations KCAC and KDKB, who was killed in an automobile accident in 1977.

The original location closed in 1983 alongside the amusement park, with a final show performed as a farewell to the venue. The amphitheater would later re-open in 1985 as Compton Terrace at Firebird Lake in nearby Chandler, next to Firebird International Raceway. The venue's capacity was approximately 20,000. The first Lollapalooza, then a touring festival, held its inaugural show at Compton Terrace on July 18, 1991.

Compton Terrace hosted its last event with the Big Top "Electronic Highway Tour" on August 16, 1997. It was demolished in 2010.

== Past performers ==
Notable past performers include U2, The Police, Metallica, Def Leppard, Duran Duran, Morrissey, Eurythmics, Fleetwood Mac, Aerosmith, AC/DC, Phil Collins, Grateful Dead, Guns N' Roses, Queen, Iron Maiden, Pat Benatar, Scorpions, Molly Hatchet, Van Halen, Phish, Jane's Addiction, the New Kids On The Block, Living Colour, Nine Inch Nails, Talking Heads, Depeche Mode, The Cure, The Power Station, Orchestral Manoeuvres in the Dark, Rage Against the Machine, Ratt, The Go-Go's, R.E.M. and Bon Jovi.
