= KDUS =

Radio station in Tempe, Arizona

Coordinates: 33°21′43.2″N 111°58′5.5″W

- Tempe, Arizona; United States
- Broadcast area: Phoenix metropolitan area
- Frequency: 1060 kHz
- Branding: KDUS AM 1060

Programming
- Format: Sports radio
- Affiliations: Fox Sports Radio; VSiN Radio; Arizona State Sun Devils; Northern Arizona Lumberjacks

Ownership
- Owner: Hubbard Broadcasting, Inc.; (Phoenix FCC License Sub, LLC)
- Sister stations: KAZG, KDKB, KSLX-FM, KUPD

History
- First air date: April 16, 1960
- Former call signs: KTMP (CP); KUPD (1959–1978); KKKQ (1978–1981); KUKQ (1981–1997)
- Call sign meaning: Station branded as The Deuce

Technical information
- Licensing authority: FCC
- Facility ID: 65165
- Class: B
- Power: 5,000 watts (day); 500 watts (night)
- Repeater: 100.7 KSLX-HD2 (Scottsdale)

Links
- Public license information: Public file; LMS
- Webcast: Listen live
- Website: kdus1060.com

KDUS (1060 AM) is a commercial radio station licensed to Tempe, Arizona, United States, and serving the Phoenix metropolitan area. It airs a sports format and is an affiliate of the Vegas Stats & Information Network, along with some programming from Fox Sports Radio. It is owned by Hubbard Broadcasting, Inc., with the license held by Phoenix FCC License Sub, LLC. Its studios are on North 52nd Street west of Papago Park and the transmitter is on Calle Bella Vista near Interstate 10 in Guadalupe. The station can also be heard on HD Radio receivers at 100.7 FM KSLX-FM-HD2.

== History ==
The station signed on the air on April 16, 1960, as KUPD, pronounced Cupid. It was owned by the Tri-State Broadcasting Co. and by the 1960s featured Phoenix veteran disc jockey Bill Heywood in the morning. KUPD had a full-service Middle of the Road (MOR) format. It competed with KOY 550 AM.

As the Top 40 format became more popular, KUPD flipped to a contemporary hits sound in the early 1970s. Around 1971, the station added a simulcast on 97.9 KUPD-FM, which remained Top 40 until about 1978 when the FM station switched to album rock and became a dominant presence in the Phoenix radio market.

The flip of KUPD-FM to rock sparked 1060 AM to also change. It became KKKQ "The New KQ" under Program Director Steve Casey, formerly with Top 40 leader KHJ Los Angeles and later one of the co-creators of MTV. KKKQ played oldies with a less talk, more music approach. The staff included Joe Bailey - mornings; Don Richards - Middays; Steve Casey - Afternoons. Don Richards would later take over as PD when Steve Casey left for MTV.

In the 1980s and early 1990s, AM 1060 cycled through various musical formats such as R&B 'KQ' from 1981 to 1987. The call letters slightly changed to KUKQ after a public outcry about having 'KKK' in the call letters for an R&B station. It then tried country music as "KQ Country") from 1987 to 1989. Then it flipped to alternative rock from 1989 to 1993.

During this time, KUKQ's original license was not renewed as the result of a 1988 comparative renewal hearing for KUKQ and KUPD-FM. Both stations lost their original licenses for lying to the Federal Communications Commission (FCC) about an alleged secret owner. An additional owner was ruled unfit to hold a license due to a 1982 criminal conviction in Arizona. The stations were instead awarded to former owner Jack Grimm, his wife Jackie, Ruth Clifford, and radio executive Robert Fish, doing business as G&C Broadcasting. In 1992, G&C took over KUKQ and KUPD-FM on new licenses, retaining the call letters, facilities and formats of the stations.

The new owners switched to a talk radio format in 1993. The station returned to alternative rock again the next year after the station was sold to Sandusky Newspapers. The alternative revival did not last long. For a brief time in 1996, 1060 AM became "KUPD-2" (billed by management as "rock entertainment"). It flipped to sports talk later that year.

After the switch to sports, the station started referring to itself as "The Deuce," and the call letters officially shifted to KDUS in 1997. Once its identity as a sports talk station become established, KDUS stopped using "Deuce" in its slogans, and adopted "The Fan AM 1060" as its identifier ("The Fan" for short) and "The Voice of the Fan" as its slogan.

On April 1, 2013, The Fan AM 1060 changed its affiliation from Yahoo! Sports Radio to the new NBC Sports Radio network. Its branding switched to "NBC Sports Radio AM 1060". By August 30, 2019, KDUS removed all associations with NBC Sports Radio, rebranding as "KDUS AM 1060" and affiliating with SB Nation Radio. In July 2020, the radio network changed its name to SportsMap.

== Programming ==
=== Sports talk shows ===
KDUS airs four hours worth of local programming on weekdays. It also carries two nationally syndicated sports programs: The Dan Patrick Show from Premiere Networks (Phoenix's primary Fox Sports Radio affiliate, 910 KGME, runs alternate programming instead of Patrick) and The Jim Rome Show from Westwood One.

Some daytime, overnights and most weekend programming is provided by Vegas Stats & Information Network, a radio network based in Las Vegas. Brokered specialty programs air in random time slots at night and on the weekend.

=== Play-by-play ===
KDUS is the Phoenix radio home of Northern Arizona University football and NAU men's basketball. The station also broadcasts nationally syndicated NCAA and NFL football games and NCAA men's basketball games via the Sports USA Radio Network and Compass Media Networks.

KDUS is also the flagship station for Arizona State University baseball and ASU women's basketball. KDUS was the flagship station of the National Hockey League's Phoenix Coyotes on AM from the team's first year in 1996 through the 2007–08 season, after which its rights were acquired by 910 KGME.

KDUS carried the National Football League's Arizona Cardinals on AM from 1997 through the 2004 season, after which its rights were acquired by 620 KTAR. KDUS also aired broadcasts from the Arizona Hotshots of the short-lived Alliance of American Football. Since the AM signal of KDUS doesn't completely cover the Phoenix area, particularly at night, both the Cardinals and Coyotes arranged to have their games simulcast on FM sister stations KDKB or KSLX-FM.

== Previous logo ==
(KDUS's logo under its previous "The Fan" branding)
