= Counting the Hours =

Studio album by Digital Summer
- Released: May 11, 2010
- Recorded: Minds Eye Digital in Glendale, Arizona
- Genre: Alternative metal; hard rock
- Length: 59:42
- Label: Victim Entertainment
- Producer: Kyle Winterstein Digital Summer

Digital Summer chronology
Hollow (2007)	Counting the Hours (2010)	Breaking Point (2012)

Singles from Counting the Hours
- 1. "Just Run" Released: February 16, 2010; 2. "Playing the Saint" Released: tbd

Professional ratings
Review scores
Source	Rating
The New Review	4.5/5 stars
Full Metal Rock	4.5/5 stars

Counting the Hours is the second full-length studio album by alternative metal band Digital Summer. It was released on May 11, 2010, and features the singles "Just Run" and "Playing the Saint."

== Track listing ==
No.	Title	Length
1.	"Counting the Hours"	3:53
2.	"Just Run"	3:15
3.	"Hostage"	3:17
4.	"Playing the Saint"	3:49
5.	"Shallow (Closer than the Angels)"	3:55
6.	"Anybody Out There"	3:14
7.	"Morphine"	4:13
8.	"The Thrill"	3:49
9.	"Rescue Me"	3:25
10.	"Today"	4:08
11.	"Inside My Head"	3:39
12.	"Use Me"	4:34
13.	"So Beautiful, So Evil"	3:18
14.	"Not Even God"	3:34
15.	"Something More"	3:23
16.	"While the City Sleeps"	4:15

== Personnel ==
- Kyle Winterstein - vocals, guitar, producer
- Ian Winterstein - guitar
- Johnmark Cenfield - guitar
- Anthony Hernandez- bass
- Ben Anderson - drums, assistant engineer
- Larry Elyea, Mind's Eye Digital - engineer
- Mike Bozzi at Bernie Grundman - mastering
- Morgan Rose of Sevendust - guest drums and vocals
