= KAZG =

Oldies radio station in Scottsdale, Arizona

- Scottsdale, Arizona; United States
- Broadcast area: Phoenix metropolitan area
- Frequency: 1440 kHz
- Branding: Oldies 92.7

Programming
- Format: Oldies

Ownership
- Owner: Hubbard Broadcasting, Inc.; (Phoenix FCC License Sub, LLC)
- Sister stations: KSLX-FM, KDKB, KDUS, KUPD

History
- First air date: 1956 (as KPOK)
- Former call signs: KPOK (1956–1961); KWBY (1961–1964); KDOT (1964–1976); KSGR (1976–1978); KOPA (1978–1980); KXAM (1980–1982); KOPA (1982–1996); KSLX (1996–2001)
- Call sign meaning: "Arizona Gold" (previous branding)

Technical information
- Licensing authority: FCC
- Facility ID: 11272
- Class: AM & FM: D
- Power: AM: 5,000 watts day; 52 watts night
- ERP: FM: 250 watts
- HAAT: FM: 449 meters (1,473 ft)
- Transmitter coordinates: 33°28′43.00″N 111°56′24.00″W
- Translator: 92.7 K224CJ (Phoenix)
- Repeater: (93.3-2) KDKB-HD2 (Mesa)

Links
- Public license information: Public file; LMS
- Webcast: Listen Live
- Website: oldies927az.com

KAZG (1440 AM) is a radio station broadcasting an oldies format. Licensed to Scottsdale, Arizona, United States, the station covers the Phoenix metropolitan area. KAZG is owned by Hubbard Broadcasting, Inc. and licensed to Phoenix FCC License Sub, LLC. The station's studios are located in North 52nd Street west of Papago Park and its AM transmitter is in Scottsdale. KAZG can also be heard on 92.7 FM via an FM translator and brands itself as "Oldies 92.7".

== History ==
KAZG signed on in 1956 as KPOK ("Cowpoke") in Scottsdale. Like many stations in the Phoenix area at the time, it originally ran a country-music format. KPOK became KWBY in 1961.

Beginning in 1964, AM 1440 was known as KDOT; it aired an adult-standards format until 1976, when it changed calls to KSGR ("K-Sugar") to fit an oldies format. This lasted until 1978 when it became KOPA. Beginning in the 1960s, it simulcasted on FM 100.7, which continued under various formats and call letters until the mid-1990s.

The station was assigned the call letters KOPA on April 24, 1978. On September 1, 1980, the station changed its call sign to KXAM, and adopted an urban format. On March 25, 1982, they reverted to KOPA, then on February 19, 1996, to KSLX, and on April 1, 2001, to the current KAZG. For about a year in the mid-1990s, the format was CNN Headline News.

== Programming ==
KAZG currently programs an automated format of oldies from the 1960s and 1970s.

In 2018, Steve Goddard, a well-known local radio host, became the afternoon host for KAZG, bringing his two nationally syndicated radio shows, "The 70's with Steve Goddard" and "Goddard's Gold", with him.

Steve Goddard's local radio show can be heard every weekday from 3 PM-7 PM, "The 70's with Steve Goddard" can be heard every Saturday morning from 7 AM-10 AM, and "Goddard's Gold" can be heard every Sunday morning from 9 AM-12 PM.

Occasionally, KAZG 1440 AM serves as an overflow station for coverage of NAU Men's Basketball, ASU Women's Basketball, and ASU Baseball games that would otherwise air on KDUS AM 1060.

== Transmitter ==
KAZG is popularly referred to as "The Lumberyard" or "Lumberyard 1440" due to the location of its transmitter, directly behind an actual lumber yard at the corner of 64th Street and Thomas Road in south Scottsdale. From this intersection, the transmitter building is accessible via a dirt path bordering the eastern side of the Salt River Project's Crosscut Canal.

The station transmits at 5,000 watts during daytime hours, and is thus listenable throughout much of the Phoenix metro area. At night, however, the station broadcasts at a much lower 52 watts, thus making the station barely listenable outside of the East Valley during nighttime hours. It has a single-tower, non-directional antenna.

Since AM 1440 was originally licensed as an AM daytimer before the Federal Communications Commission (FCC) abolished the designation, it had been required to turn off its transmitter at local sundown, and allowed to turn it back on at local sunrise. Although KAZG was now licensed by the FCC to transmit at 52 watts of power at night, former owner Sandusky Radio usually opted to turn off the transmitter, apparently to avoid the electricity expense of transmitting at such an unusable power level. On rare occasions, such as when it carried Arizona State baseball or University of Arizona football as an "overflow" station of KDUS, the station would switch to its nighttime power.

Radio observers liked to refer to the station's regulator of sunrise/sunset power switches as the "lamp timer", since the times of switching were irregular and tended to drift away from FCC specifications over time, as if the switches were driven by a cheap mechanical lamp timer.

In March 2012, KAZG began transmitting at its fully licensed 52 watts of power during nighttime hours, becoming a 24/7 station for the first time in its history. When the Sandusky Radio stations were purchased by Hubbard in 2013, this practice continued.

On January 25, 2016, KAZG rebranded as "Oldies 92.7" (the 92.7 in the branding is for FM translator K224CJ 92.7 FM Phoenix). K224CJ had been independently owned and had simulcast several stations in its history. It was not until 2017 that Hubbard bought the translator for $1.8 million, setting a record for the highest sale price ever commanded by an FM translator.
