= Leslie Fish =

American musician, author and activist (1944–2025)

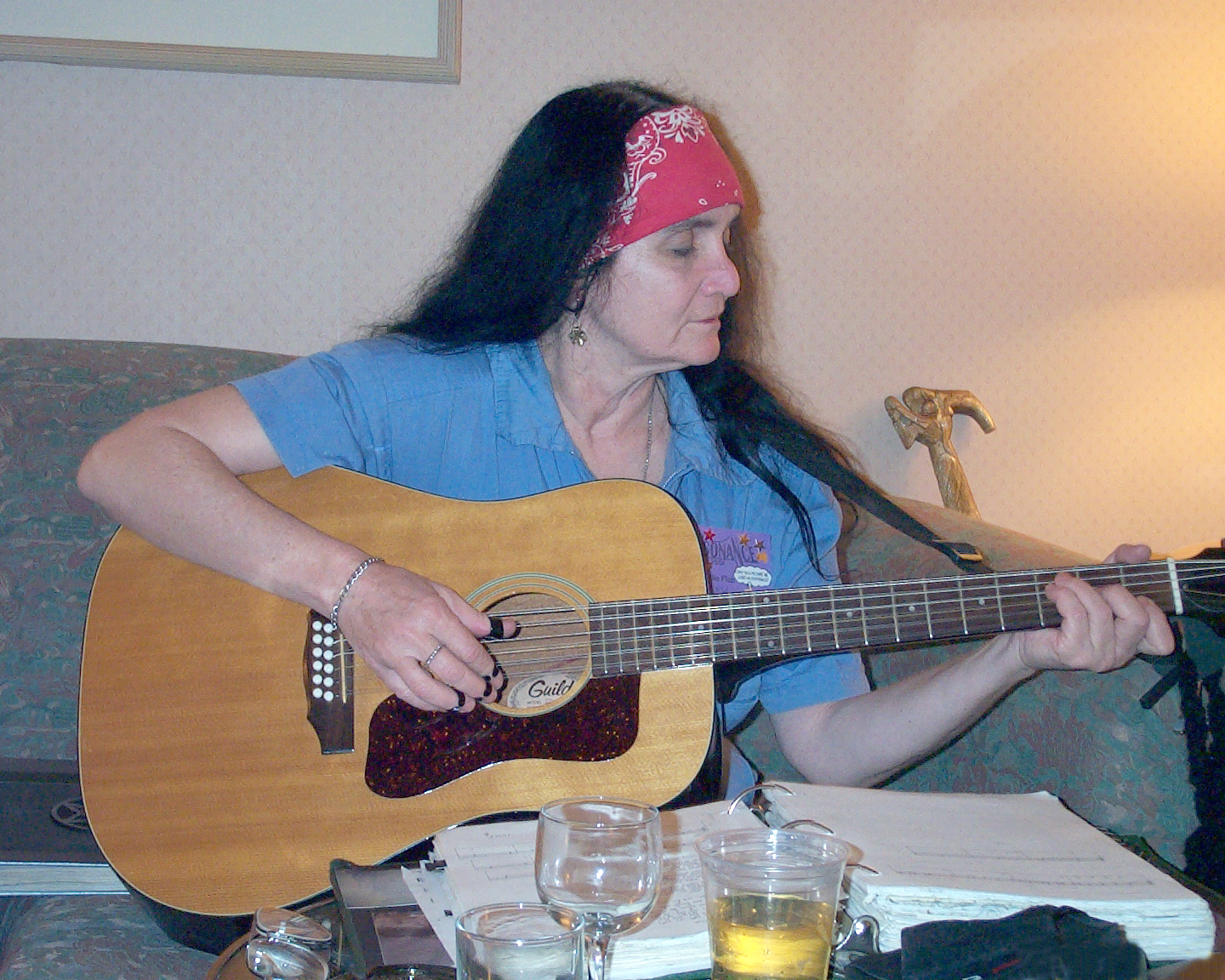
- Fish in 2001

Background information
- Born: March 11, 1944; New Jersey, U.S.
- Died: November 29, 2025 (aged 81)
- Genres: Folk; filk
- Occupations: Musician; author; writer
- Instrument: Guitar
- Years active: 1975–2025
- Labels: Random Factors; Prometheus Music
- Website: (archived)

Leslie Fish (March 11, 1944 – November 29, 2025) was an American folk musician, author, anarchist and political activist.

== Music ==
Fish's early exposure to folk music included childhood visits to Woody Guthrie, which were profiled in the 1967 book The American Folk Scene: Dimensions of the Folksong Revival (p. 198-199).

Along with The Dehorn Crew, Fish created the first commercial filk recording in 1976, Folk Songs for Folk Who Ain't Even Been Yet. Her second recording, Solar Sailors (1977), included the song "Banned from Argo", a comic song parodying Star Trek which has since spawned over 100 variants and parodies. She recorded the comic song "Carmen Miranda's Ghost", which was the source for the short story anthology Carmen Miranda's Ghost Is Haunting Space Station Three, edited by Don Sakers (in which she has one story and the notes on the song). A copy of Fish's Carmen Miranda's Ghost album sold for $1,175 on December 8, 2020, making it one of the most expensive filk recordings ever sold.

Her song "Hope Eyrie" is regarded by some as being as close to the anthem of American science fiction fandom as is possible in such a disparate group.

Fish often wove pagan and anarchist themes into her music. She had also set to music many poems by Rudyard Kipling. She was a popular guest at science fiction conventions, and she could often be seen at the large filksings with her distinctive 12-string guitar, "Monster", which Leslie said played best when it was given good Scotch whisky.

== Film and television ==
Fish sang (and made several appearances) in the film Finding the Future: A Science Fiction Conversation, which makes extensive use of her music. She was interviewed and performed in Trekkies 2.

Her song "PGP" was featured in the Channel 4 (UK) television documentary "Seeking Satoshi", released in 2025.

== Political activism ==
Fish was involved with numerous political causes, most notably anti-war activism during the Vietnam War, and was a longtime member of the Industrial Workers of the World, a fact referred to in several of her songs (e.g., "Wobblies from Space", "Leslie's Filks"). Fish's songs "Babylon Updated" and "Freedom Road" were featured in the 36th edition of the IWW's "Little Red Songbook". This hymnal for working people first appeared in 1909.

She was also well known as a gun-rights activist, and had asserted that private gun ownership is the only true protection of individual freedom (a topic touched on in several of her songs). Because of her distrust of the stability of modern society, she had in the past worked to organize groups for carrying on civilization after what she (at one time, at least) considered the imminent collapse of the current society. Her album Firestorm was in large part meant as a set of instructions for surviving a nuclear war, on the reasoning that it would be easier to recall them if they were in lyric form.

On anarchism, Fish said: "What sort of anarchist future would I like to see? There's no reason for a government-free society to be nothing but agrarian, no reason at all that it couldn't be industrial and space-faring."

The character "Jenny Trout" in the science fiction novel Fallen Angels by Larry Niven, Jerry Pournelle, and Michael Flynn is clearly meant to be Fish, although Trout is portrayed as a Marxist.

== Other activities ==
In addition to her work as a folk artist, Fish was also well known within the Star Trek fan community for her works of fan fiction, which include "Shelter" (1976), one of the first Kirk/Spock stories ever published, and the fan-published Star Trek novel The Weight. In Textual Poachers, a landmark study of fan communities, MIT's Henry Jenkins described Fish's anarchist-feminist Star Trek novel The Weight as a "compelling narrative" "remarkable in the scope and complexity of its conception, the precision of its execution, and the explicitness of its political orientation." Fish also wrote original novels and short stories, both alone and in collaboration with C. J. Cherryh and others. Fish's song, "Carmen Miranda's Ghost is Haunting Space Station Three", inspired a collection of short stories with the same title, edited by Don Sakers and featuring stories by Cherryh and Anne McCaffrey.

Fish was an avid roleplaying gamer, especially live-action role playing, or LARPing. She was a member of the Society for Creative Anachronism (SCA) since the 1970s. Since 2007, she had been the driving force behind the establishment of Fan Haven, a 230-acre (93 ha) private park in Arizona meant to serve as a safe space for LARPers, Pagans, naturists, SCAdians, and other marginalized groups associated with fandom. However, representatives of the federal government have disputed the validity of the mining claim that she proposed to use to establish ownership.

While Fish rarely discussed her private life, she was in a romantic relationship with anarchist political activist Mary Frohman "from the late '60s through the early '80s." Together they were part of the Dehorn Crew, the house band for the IWW. Fish had often asserted that bisexuality is the human norm, and that the pervasive sexual repression she saw in current society causes many of the current social ills. She married long-time friend Robert "Rasty Bob" Ralston on November 13, 2011.

One of Fish's personal projects was an ongoing attempt to breed domestic cats for intelligence and other traits, including polydactyly. She claimed that her cats are about as intelligent as a six-year-old human child, except in regards to symbolic language.

From 2013, Fish and Ralston worked to develop a rare and endangered-species orchard, according to a post written on Fish's own blog.

== Death ==
Fish died in hospice care at her home, on November 29, 2025, at the age of 81.

== Albums ==
All Off Centaur Publications, Firebird Arts & Music and Wail Songs albums are cassettes; all Random Factors albums are CDs except as noted. All Off Centaur albums are out of print (OOP) as of 1988 unless reissued; all Wail Songs albums are OOP as of c. 1999. All Fish solo albums from Firebird are OOP as of 1995.

(Fish appears as singer, player, composer and/or lyricist on most of the Off Centaur anthology tapes (including A Wolfrider's Reflections, reissued by Richard & Wendy Pini on their own label, also OOP), on many of the Firebird Mercedes Lackey anthology albums, and on a number of convention live albums from Conglomeration, DAG, Off Centaur, Wail Songs and others; she also appears on the anthology The Pegasus Winners ("Love Songs"; OOP).)

- Minus Ten and Counting 1983 (contributor) (Off Centaur) (Out of print)
- Folk Songs for Folk Who Ain't Even Been Yet (with the Dehorn Crew), 1976 LP (T.J. Phoenix), 1991 tape (Firebird) (both OOP)
- Solar Sailors (with Dehorn Crew), 1977 LP (Bandersnatchi Press), 1989 tape (Firebird) (OOP)
- Folk Songs for Solar Sailors (with Dehorn Crew), 2002 (collection of above two; Random Factors)
- Skybound 1982 (Off Centaur) (OOP), 2005 (Random Factors)
- Cold Iron (Kipling), 1983, 1986 (Off Centaur, OOP), 1991 (Firebird, OOP), 2007 (Random Factors)
- The Undertaker's Horse (Kipling),1985 (Off Centaur), 1990 (Firebird) (both OOP)
- Chickasaw Mountain, 1986 (Off Centaur), 1991 (Firebird) (OOP)
- It's Sister Jenny's Turn to Throw the Bomb, 1987 (Off Centaur), (c. 1992 Firebird w/1987 date) (OOP)
- Firestorm: Songs of the Third World War, 1989 (Firebird) (two slightly different versions, not noted in liner notes) (OOP)
- Leslie Fish...Live!, 1989 (Firebird) (OOP)
- Our Fathers of Old (with Joe Bethancourt) (1993 tape (OOP), 2002 CD (adds bonus tracks with Kristoph Klover) Random Factors)
- Serious Steel (with Joe Bethancourt), 1995 (tape & CD) (Random Factors)
- Smoked Fish and Friends (live, with four others), 1996 (Random Factors)
- Not Canned or Frozen, 1996 (Wail Songs) (OOP)
- Lock & Load, 2009 (Random Factors)
- Avalon Is Risen, 2012 (Prometheus Music)
- Sea of Dreams, 2022 (Prometheus Music)
- Angel with a Sword, 2022 (Prometheus Music)
- Fish Scraps, Vol. 1, 2023 (Prometheus Music)
- Elfland, 2026 (Prometheus Music, forthcoming)

== Books ==
- A Dirge for Sabis (with C. J. Cherryh), collected in The Sword of Knowledge trilogy
- Offensive as Hell: The Joys of Jesus-Freak Bagging, nonfiction
- Of Elven Blood, fantasy-romance, from Jupiter Gardens Publishing

== Short stories ==
The following short stories were produced as part of the Merovingen Nights series of science fiction books. The series was edited by C. J. Cherryh.

- "First Night Cruise" in Festival Moon
- "Guardian" in Festival Moon
- "War of the Unseen Worlds" in Fever Season
- "Treading the Maze" in Troubled Waters
- "Fair Game" in Smuggler's Gold
- "Run Silent, Run Cheap" in Divine Right
- "Walking on the Waves" in Flood Tide

The following short stories appeared in the War World series, a shared universe created by Jerry Pournelle:

- "Janesfort War" (with Frank Gasperik), in CoDominium: Revolt on War World
- "Nothing in Common", in War World: Discovery
- "To Win the Peace" (with Frank Gasperik), in War World: Takeover

Her short story "Thunderbird Road" was published in the 1996 anthology Space Opera.

Fanzine article

Writing as F. Sigmund Mead, "A Summary of the Physiological Roots of Andorian Culture" (Journal of Xenoanthropology, June 2341), edited by Leslie Fish. Fictional article on Andorian culture first published in Sehlat's Roar No. 2, a Star Trek fanzine of the 1970s, published by Randy Ash.

== Awards ==
=== Pegasus Awards ===
- 1984: Best Original Filk Song—"Hope Eyrie"
- 1986: Best Original Filk Song—"Witnesses' Waltz"
- 1986: Best Female Filker
- 1987: Best Writer/Composer
- 1989: Best Fantasy Song—"Wind's Four Quarters" (with Mercedes Lackey)
- 1999: Best Hero Song—"A Toast for Unknown Heroes"
- 2002: Best Song That Tells a Story—"Horsetamer's Daughter"
- 2003: Best Classic Filk Song—"Banned from Argo"
- 2005: Best Space Opera Song—"Signy Mallory" (with Mercedes Lackey)
- 2005: Best Sword & Sorcery Song—"Threes" (with Mercedes Lackey)

=== Other awards ===
- 2014 Prometheus Special Award for Novella (Tower of Horses) and Song ("The Horsetamer's Daughter").
