= KSLX-FM =

Classic rock radio station in Scottsdale, Arizona, United States

Coordinates: 33.331°N 112.064°W

- Scottsdale, Arizona; United States
- Broadcast area: Phoenix metropolitan area
- Frequency: 100.7 MHz (HD Radio)
- Branding: Classic Rock 100.7 KSLX

Programming
- Format: Classic rock
- Subchannels: HD2: Sports (KDUS simulcast)

Ownership
- Owner: Hubbard Broadcasting, Inc.; (Phoenix FCC License Sub, LLC)
- Sister stations: KUPD, KDKB, KAZG

History
- First air date: August 1, 1969
- Former call signs: KDOT-FM (1969–1978); KOPA-FM (1978–1986)
- Call sign meaning: Similar to "classics"

Technical information
- Licensing authority: FCC
- Facility ID: 11282
- Class: C
- ERP: 100,000 watts
- HAAT: 561 meters (1,841 ft)

Links
- Public license information: Public file; LMS
- Webcast: Listen Live
- Website: kslx.com

KSLX-FM is a classic rock radio station serving the Phoenix, Arizona, area. The Hubbard Broadcasting, Inc. outlet broadcasts at 100.7 MHz with an ERP of 100 kW and is licensed to Scottsdale, Arizona. KSLX simulcasts in digital HD Radio. Its studios are located on North 52nd Street west of Papago Park and its transmitter is in South Mountain Park.

== History ==
100.7 signed on August 1, 1969 as KDOT-FM "K-Dot", a beautiful music station co-owned with KDOT (1440 AM). Owned by Central Arizona Broadcasting, KDOT-FM broadcast beautiful music from studios on the second floor of a building adjacent to the Safari Resort hotel, on Scottsdale Road just north of Camelback Road in Scottsdale.

In 1978, First Media Corporation acquired KDOT and its AM counterpart, then known as KSGR, and flipped the stations to Top 40 as simulcasting KOPA-AM-FM. The call sign KOPA was pronounced "copa" and reflected the last two syllables of Maricopa County (home to Scottsdale and the greater Phoenix metropolitan area). The station operated as KOPA until February 5, 1986, when the station's call sign and format were changed again, to KSLX-FM. KSLX hosted a popular morning program in the late 1980s, the "Jones and Boze Show", featuring David K. Jones and Bob Boze Bell. Bell is a popular local western artist and writer (and co-owner and Executive Editor of True West Magazine since 1999). The station would later be acquired by Sandusky as a sister station to KDKB and KUPD, thus creating a rock cluster in the market. In 2013 Minneapolis based Hubbard Broadcasting bought the five-stations and has operated them ever since.

In 2017 KSLX ascended to the top of the Phoenix ratings for the first time in its 31 year history. The station now plays Led Zeppelin, the Eagles, Def Leppard, AC/DC, Journey, the Beatles, Pat Benatar, the Rolling Stones and more. The on-air line-up includes Mark and NeanderPaul from 5-10am weekdays, Karen Dalessandro 2-7pm weekdays and Nights with Alice Cooper 7pm-12 midnight weeknights.

== HD radio ==
KSLX's HD Radio signal is multiplexed. The main signal is broadcast in analog as well as an HD Radio Digital broadcast of KSLX's classic rock programming.

KSLX's HD2 subchannel is airing a simulcast of sports-formatted KDUS 1060 AM Tempe.
