= Hollow (Digital Summer EP) =

EP by Digital Summer
- Released: March 31, 2008
- Recorded: Minds Eye Digital in Tempe, Arizona
- Genre: Hard rock; alternative rock; acoustic
- Length: 49:22
- Label: Unsigned
- Producer: Larry Elyea and Digital Summer

Digital Summer chronology
Cause and Effect (2007)	Hollow (2008)	Counting the Hours (2010)

Professional ratings
Review scores
Source	Rating
Melodic.net	2.5/5 stars

Hollow is an EP/DVD release from alternative metal band Digital Summer. It was released on March 31, 2008, and featured the single "Rescue Me".

== Track listing ==
Disc 1

1. "Whatever It Takes" (Acoustic) – 3:40
2. "Use Me" (Acoustic) – 4:27
3. "Suffocate" (Acoustic) – 3:59
4. "Sweet Misery" (Acoustic) – 4:55
5. "Rescue Me" – 3:30
6. "Worth the Pain" – 5:41

Disc 2

1. "Rescue Me" music video
2. Live concert footage
3. Behind the scenes

== Miscellaneous information ==
- The first disc includes acoustic versions of "Whatever it Takes" and "Suffocate," both tracks from their first release Cause and Effect along with 4 brand new tracks. The second disc features a music video for the song "Rescue Me," live concert footage, and footage from behind the scenes.
- The music video for "Rescue Me" was filmed and produced by Motion Army. The storyboard for the video included a scene of a car accident and featured both friends and co-workers of the band.

== Personnel ==
- Kyle Winterstein – vocals, guitar
- Raymond Amparan – guitar
- Johnmark Cenfield – guitar
- Anthony Hernandez – bass
- Chris Carlson – drums
- Larry Elyea, Mind's Eye Digital – producer and engineer
