= William Edward Compton =

American radio personality (1945–1977)

- Born: December 29, 1945; Henderson, Texas, US
- Died: June 21, 1977 (aged 31); Phoenix, Arizona
- Occupation: Radio personality

William Edward "Bill" Compton III (December 29, 1945 – June 21, 1977) was an American radio personality best known for creating Phoenix's first free-form radio station, KCAC-AM, and helping to "invent" notable AOR station, KDKB-FM. Compton Terrace, an amphitheater in Phoenix was named in his honor and he was inducted into the Arizona Music & Entertainment Hall of Fame in 2005.

== Early life ==
Compton was born in Henderson, Texas, but his family soon moved to Tyler, Texas, where he attended John Tyler High School and got his first disc jockey job in 1964.

== Radio career ==
Compton first began to influence Phoenix radio in 1969 when top-40 radio station KRUX-AM hired him to host a Sunday night free-form show. Using the on-air name of "Little Willie Sunshine," Compton played a diverse collection of music—folk, blues, jazz, and, of course, tracks on albums other than their hit singles.

The opportunity arose for Compton to become the station manager of a failing Spanish-language station, KCAC-AM. At the time, KCAC was a low-power AM station that was only allowed to broadcast during daytime hours. Compton used it to continue the freeform format he had pioneered at KRUX—hosting on-air shifts and hiring similarly minded disc jockeys such as Gary Kinsey (on-air name, Toad Hall) and Hank Cookenboo. Initially housed in a small house on Camelback Road, KCAC quickly attracted a loyal audience seeking an alternative to Top-40 radio. Mark Davis, a guest columnist in the Arizona Republic described its air sound:

Free-form programming as used by KCAC allows the individual announcer complete discretion. This allows some of the innovations in rock air time denied under Top 40 programming, as well as opening the door to other musical forms. A typical show on KCAC will include elements of jazz, blues, folk, classical, hillbilly, country, soul and, of course rock. The absence of prescheduled news programs allows occasional hour-and-a-half collages of uninterrupted music.

KCAC could not sustain itself financially and went into bankruptcy in November 1970.

The year after KCAC's demise, Compton helped bring FM station KDKB to the airwaves—debuting on August 23, 1971. He served as its first program director and, along with co-owner Dwight Tindle, developed its format as a progressive rock station—the earliest FM station in Phoenix to adopt that format fulltime.

== Death ==
Compton died in a car accident in June 1977, age 31.
