= After Hours with Joe Bushkin =

Studio album by Joe Bushkin and Trio
- Released: 1951
- Genre: Jazz
- Label: Columbia

Professional ratings
Review scores
Source	Rating
Allmusic	3/5 stars

After Hours with Joe Bushkin is a ten-inch album released by Joe Bushkin in 1951 on Columbia CL 6201. It was also released as a seven-inch box set of four EPs on Columbia B-290.

== Personnel ==
- Buck Clayton – trumpet
- Eddie Safranski – bass (4 tracks)
- Sid Weiss – bass (4 tracks)
- Jo Jones – drums
- Joe Bushkin – piano

== Track listing ==
1. "Dinah"
2. "If I Had You"
3. "Once in a While"
4. "California, Here I Come"
5. "They Can't Take That Away from Me"
6. "At Sundown" (W. Donaldson)
7. "High Cotton" (Joe Bushkin)
8. "Ol' Man River"
