= After Hours: Unplugged & Rewired =

Studio album by Digital Summer
- Released: 8 October 2013
- Genre: Acoustic rock
- Length: 55:06

Digital Summer chronology
Breaking Point (2012)	After Hours: Unplugged & Rewired (2013)

After Hours: Unplugged & Rewired is the first acoustic album from Arizona alternative metal band Digital Summer. Being an unplugged rendition of their three studio albums, the album, which includes three new tracks ("This City," "Closer to Me," and "Demons"), was released on October 8, 2013.

== Touring ==
In support of the album, the band hosted a live acoustic performance for 300 people at The Roxy Lounge in Phoenix, Arizona supported by an unplugged show from Phoenix rock band Man Made Machine.

== Critical reception ==
With respect to the album, Morgan Rose from Sevendust said that "not many heavy rock bands can pull off acoustic album, but Digital Summer NAILED IT!"

== Track listing ==
1. This City - 4:43
2. Forget You [Explicit] - 3:21
3. Shallow (Closer Than the Angels) - 4:01
4. Suffocate - 3:58
5. Closer to Me - 3:32
6. Dance in the Fire - 3:42
7. Morphine - 4:11
8. Use Me - 4:28
9. Whatever It Takes - 3:40
10. Demons - 4:35
11. Broken Halo - 4:09
12. Sweet Misery - 4:49
13. Worth the Pain - 5:57
