= KDKB =

Radio station in Mesa, Arizona, United States

- Mesa, Arizona; United States
- Broadcast area: Phoenix metropolitan area
- Frequency: 93.3 MHz (HD Radio)
- Branding: Alt AZ 93-3

Programming
- Format: Alternative rock
- Subchannels: HD2: Oldies (KAZG simulcast)

Ownership
- Owner: Hubbard Broadcasting, Inc.; (Phoenix FCC License Sub, LLC)
- Sister stations: KSLX-FM, KDUS, KAZG, KUPD

History
- First air date: April 20, 1968 (as KMND)
- Former call signs: KMND (1968–August 16, 1971); KDKB-FM (1971–October 4, 1978)
- Call sign meaning: Dwight Karma Broadcasting

Technical information
- Licensing authority: FCC
- Facility ID: 41299
- Class: C
- ERP: 100,000 watts
- HAAT: 508 meters (1,667 ft)
- Transmitter coordinates: 33°20′4″N 112°3′36″W

Links
- Public license information: Public file; LMS
- Webcast: Listen Live
- Website: altaz933.com

KDKB (93.3 FM "Alt AZ 93-3") is a commercial radio station broadcasting to the Phoenix metropolitan area with its city of license in Mesa, Arizona. It is owned by Hubbard Broadcasting, Inc. with the license held by Phoenix FCC License Sub, LLC. It airs an alternative rock radio format. Its studios are located in Phoenix, while its transmitter is in South Mountain Park.

== History ==
=== KYEW (1960–1962) ===
The first radio station on 93.3 in Phoenix was short-lived KYEW, owned by Frank S. Barc, which went on the air May 9, 1960. KYEW's license was canceled and its call letters deleted as of April 18, 1962.

=== Easy listening (1968–1971) ===
On April 20, 1968, the current 93.3 license first signed on the air as the sister station to 1510 AM (now KFNN). Originally, the station was KMND, broadcasting an easy listening music format branded as "Command Radio".

=== Rock (1971–2014) ===
On August 23, 1971, the format was changed to progressive rock. In many respects, this format was a continuation of the free-form format of KCAC, a daytime-only station that was going bankrupt. According to KDKB co-owner Dwight Tindle, he and KCAC program director, William Edward "Bill" Compton, "invented KDKB" and its air sound. Moreover, Compton and several of KCAC's DJs were hired to staff KDKB and they originally intended to continue its free-form format. In a 1971 Arizona Republic article announcing the new station, Tindle is quoted about the format:

Progressive rock is a bad way to describe it. Free form is a better term. An announcer is free to do whatever he chooses. He may follow a classical piece with Crosby, Stills and Nash and follow that with blues. If he feels bad that day he may just say he's had a bad day and that he feels like playing nothing but blues. It's totally honest. And we try to screen our advertising. We won't run ads that aren't true. We won't have people who scream at you or any catchy little jingles.

Despite these intentions, KDKB quickly became a conventional progressive-rock station and evolved into one of the most powerful album oriented rock (AOR) stations in Phoenix. It was the first AOR station in the Phoenix media market, and one of the first AOR stations in America.

KDKB-FM's rock format was simulcast on 1510 KDKB (AM). In 1978, the AM simulcast was broken and 1510 changed formats to oldies. The AM call letters were changed to KDJQ ("The Golden Rock") with program director Robert M. Chenault and morning DJ Griffin Gary "Toad Hall" Kinsey, followed later by Bruce "Brother Bruce" Baumbush. In 1980, the format on KDJQ changed to new wave music for a brief time, with Jonathan "Johnny D." Dixon as the program director and Jonathan L as assistant program director, music director, and evening personality. 1510 is now broadcasting a Financial/Business News format as KFNN.

Throughout the 1980s, KDKB evolved into more of an adult-leaning direction focusing on the classic rock artists.

A favorite segment during the summer in the early 80's was reading listener shared "Dashboard Recipes" at noon. Everything from cookies and pastries to nachos and slow cooked chili were favorites.

Starting in March 1989, KDKB was anchored in mornings by the "Tim & Mark" show. The show proved to be one of the most popular in Phoenix radio history, lasting through 2005. The show featured regular segments like "Helium Hilarity" and "Rump Ranger". Tim & Mark did night time anniversary shows every year at places like the Tempe Improv and the Celebrity Theater.

Tim & Mark also contributed hundreds of thousands of dollars to local charities. They sold their annual "Best Of Tim & Mark" CDs throughout the Valley while doing autograph signings at Wherehouse Music stores. All of the profits were then given to charity.

Tim & Mark left KDKB in early 2005. Their last show featured listeners calling in and thanking them for their show and also had Arizona Governor Janet Napolitano and Secretary of State Betsy Bayless call in to thank them and wish them well.

On September 5, 2006, KDKB began playing full-length albums of classic rock artists without the use of any on-air personalities. On September 15, 2006, KDKB returned to its mainstream rock format with the new slogan, "Everything That Rocks", including a larger variety of rock artists along with special programming features including '80s themed weekends.

In mid 2010, the station initiated the slogan, "KDKB Rocks Arizona!", and retooled the entire on-air lineup. In the fall of 2013, the station changed its lineup and featuring Shmonty & Conklin in the mornings, Ruby Cheeks midday, KDKB's Program Director and DJ Paul "Neanderpaul" Marshall in afternoons, and Mike Gaube at night. In 2013, Sandusky Radio sold its stations in Phoenix and Seattle to Hubbard Broadcasting, including KDKB.

=== Alternative (2014–present) ===
On September 17, 2014, at 10 a.m., KDKB dropped its rock format after 43 years (which would move to KDKB's HD2 sub-channel), and began stunting as "93.3 The Cheese" playing songs by jazz-lounge cover artist Richard Cheese. At noon that day, 93.3 flipped to Alternative Rock as "Alt AZ 93.3". The last song on "KDKB" was "Living After Midnight" by Judas Priest (by coincidence, an ad would air immediately after promoting a November 2014 concert at Gila River Arena by the group), while the first song on "Alt AZ" was "Come with Me Now" by Paradise Valley-founded band KONGOS. This move allowed Hubbard to keep their "Wall of Rock" intact, while eliminating all overlaps between KDKB and sisters classic rock KSLX-FM and active rock KUPD.

In 2020, the station began airing the syndicated Woody Show in morning drive from KYSR in Los Angeles. Less than two years later, the show was dropped due to low ratings.

== HD radio ==
KDKB's HD Radio signal is multiplexed. The main signal airs KDKB's alternative rock programming. The second channel carried KDUS "The Fan", a valley AM sports talk radio station until June 21, 2012 when KDUS was replaced by KAZG "Arizona Gold", a co-owned oldies station that broadcasts on 1440 AM. On September 17, 2014, when KDKB's main signal flipped to alternative rock, their previous rock format moved to the HD2 subchannel. KDKB's HD2 sub-channel later switched back to a simulcast of KAZG.

== See also ==
- Compton Terrace
- Joe Bethancourt
