= After Hours (manga) =

Japanese manga series

- Cover of the first manga volume

アフターアワーズ (Afutā Awāzu)
- Genre: Yuri
- Manga
- Written by: Yuhta Nishio
- Published by: Shogakukan
- English publisher: NA: Viz Media
- Magazine: Hibana (March 6, 2015 – August 7, 2017)
- Original run: March 6, 2015 – January 12, 2018
- Volumes: 3
- icon

After Hours (Japanese: アフターアワーズ, Hepburn: Afutā Awāzu) is a Japanese yuri manga series written and illustrated by Yuhta Nishio. It was serialized in Shogakukan's Hibana seinen manga magazine from March 2015 to August 2017, when the magazine ceased its publication, and the series finished in its third and last compiled tankōbon volume released in January 2018. The manga has been licensed in North America by Viz Media.

== Plot ==
After being invited to a club by a friend, Emi Asahina (朝日奈 エミ, Asashina Emi) finds herself unable to fit in. Her friend is nowhere to be found, and she is soon troubled by unwanted attention. She is rescued by a woman named Keiko Yoinoma (宵野間 京子, Yoinoma Keiko), known as Kei (ケイ). The two connect instantly, and their night of conversation culminates in Emi visiting Kei's apartment, where their relationship becomes physical. Emi is initially confused by the sudden intimacy with Kei. However, through this new connection, she is inadvertently drawn into Kei's world of music and invited to participate as a Video Jockey (VJ) for a club event Kei is involved with. This encounter serves as Emi's introduction to a new life and a romantic relationship.

== Publication ==
Written and illustrated by Yuhta Nishio, After Hours was serialized Shogakukan's seinen manga magazine Hibana from March 6, 2015, to August 7, 2017, when the magazine ceased its publication. The series finished with its third and last compiled tankōbon volume. The three volumes were released from October 7, 2015, to January 12, 2018.

In North America, Viz Media announced the English language release of the manga in October 2016. The three volumes were released from June 13, 2017, to December 11, 2018.

=== Volumes ===
No.	Original release date	Original ISBN	English release date	English ISBN
1	October 7, 2015	978-4-09-187245-6	June 13, 2017	978-1-4215-9380-7
2	July 12, 2017	978-4-09-189633-9	June 12, 2018	978-1-9747-0025-7
3	January 12, 2018	978-4-09-189836-4	December 11, 2018	978-1-9747-0071-4
