= Jonathan L =

Radio personality and publisher (born 1946)

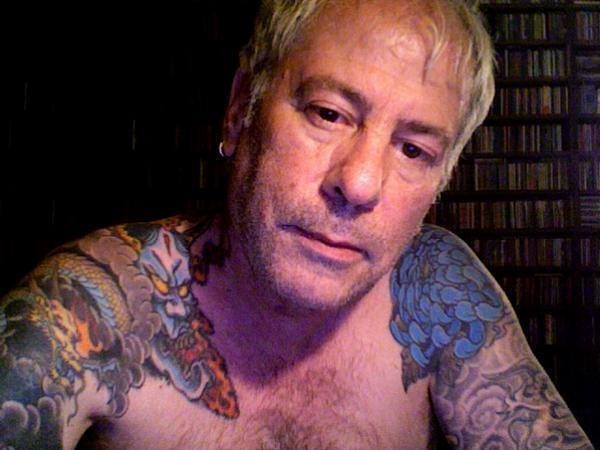
Jonathan L

Jonathan Leigh Rosen (December 5, 1946 Flatbush, Brooklyn NY-died on September 9, 2023 in Berlin, Germany), better known by his radio handle Jonathan L, was an American radio deejay, programmer, and entertainment media publisher. He organized his first large music festival for alternative station KUKQ, Q Fest, in Phoenix, Arizona in 1989, years before the launch of festivals like Lollapalooza and the KROQ Weenie Roasts. For this reason, he is often called the "father of all radio festivals."

== History ==
He left his parents' Long Island home at age 14 and lived as a street urchin with a gang of juveniles. After quitting school and being convicted of assault charges, he spent three years incarcerated in various juvenile institutions. He was out and on parole shortly before his 18th birthday and took a job as a parts man for Mack Trucks. He also began writing for an underground newspaper in Long Island called The Express.

In 1973, he left New York and headed for Berkeley, California. He fell ill when he and his wife stopped to visit friends in Tucson, Arizona, and they ended up staying there for the next thirteen years. He began self-publishing a monthly pop culture magazine called Newsreal. The publication was known for its eclectic mix of music artists, putting such stars as Joan Jett and B.B. King on the same cover. Begun in 1974, Newsreal’s circulation reached 20,000 before the publication folded in 1985.

While on a summer hiatus in 1978 in New York City, he was the editor for two issues of Drugs & Paraphernalia Digest, with the former publisher of High Times magazine.

== Career in radio ==
Jonathan L's radio career began in March 1982 in Tucson, Arizona at 96 Rock KLPX with his creation, "Virgin Vinyl". The show ran for more than four years on Sunday evenings for five hours from 7 p.m. to midnight. Among the many live guests were Henry Rollins as a co-host, Joey Ramone, The Circle Jerks, Huey Lewis, and the Meat Puppets. The music encompassed everything from Metallica to Leon Russell.

In the summer of 1986, Jonathan moved up to Mesa, Arizona to start up alternative station KEYX 100.3 with his friend John "Johnny D" Dixon, referred to as "the key to your musical future." The station ended in late 1987. Jonathan was the assistant program director and music director and held down the 7 p.m. to midnight shift Monday though Friday.

In 1988, Jonathan L was hired by Phoenix rock station 98 KUPD, where he hosted "Virgin Vinyl" on Sunday nights until 1992. The show, which included everything from Suicidal Tendencies to a then-unheard band named Nirvana, was a huge hit in Phoenix, and garnered several "Best Radio Show" awards from the Phoenix New Times, which called Jonathan L "a thoroughly modern mouthpiece" who played "forward-looking wax attacks." In 1986, they wrote of "Virgin Vinyl": "When this colorful Sunday night waxfest was imported from Tucson this year, it slapped the lethargic Phoenix radio market right in the face." Simultaneously in 1989, Jonathan L founded and became program director for KUKQ AM, Phoenix's first all-alternative music station.

He left KUKQ in 1992 to work for station KFMA in Wickenburg, Arizona. After a short stint there, he returned to KUKQ to retake over the helm as program director and again did his show "Virgin Vinyl" until he left in 1993 to join Phoenix station KDKB, where he did his award-winning "Virgin Vinyl" until 1995. In a 1996 interview with New York Now, he predicted "more British and rhythm-driven music shaking up the mid-90s cabal of American-born alterna-rock bands."

He once again returned to KUKQ from mid-1994 to mid-1995 to run the station in its wildest punk rock form. Among his most popular programs was "The Monday Morning Music Meeting Live," which gave listeners a chance to phone in and provide their own input on the music, which was added to the rotation that day.

In August 2005, Jonathan L returned once again to 98 KUPD, where he hosted and programmed "The Lopsided World of L" on Saturday mornings and Sunday nights in prime time live. Jonathan L remained there until his retirement from stateside radio in 2010.

== Album Network years ==
In the fall of 1995, Rosen left Phoenix (and radio) to accept an opportunity to become senior editor of the long time, now defunct, music industry trade publication the Album Network. He took control of "Virtually Alternative" magazine, one of many music format magazines the Album Network published.

The monthly was not only informative, but tongue-in-cheek, which Jonathan felt was a must for radio programmers. At the same time, Rosen wrote a weekly column in Album Network, "Pleasantly Annoying", a phrase that he has become well known for in both publishing and radio.

Radio wasn't gone totally during his tenure. Through the Album Network's radio syndication he was asked to host radio specials for The Cranberries, Social Distortion, Kula Shaker, and Oasis that were run by radio stations throughout the United States. The aggressive mouthpiece of alternative radio was asked to moderate panels at music industry conventions, as he had done before back in the 1980s and early 1990s.

In 2000, at a convention Album Network put on in New York city dubbed Y2K, Jonathan organized and hosted a panel of musicians to speak about everything from their careers to their personal lives in front of a packed house. The guest speakers were Ronnie Spector (The Ronettes), Glenn Danzig (Danzig), and Dee Snider (Twisted Sister). Jonathan was friends with Spector and Danzig, and thought they had more appeal and more to offer than many of the available alternative artists of that time period. Joey Ramone, also a friend, was the confirmed 4th panelist, but fell ill and couldn't make it.

In 1999, Jonathan was given Vice President stripes as SFX (and later Clear Channel) bought the Album Network and all its properties.

After more than six and a half years, Rosen left the Network Magazine Group in 2002 to launch his own independent record promotion company which he operated until 2005. In the summer of that year, Rosen decided to leave Los Angeles and go back to radio, this time to do "Lopsided World Of L" at KUPD-FM in Phoenix.

== Music festivals ==
In 1989, Jonathan L organized one of the first large-scale radio festivals in the United States, for KUKQ. The bill included the Red Hot Chili Peppers and Camper Van Beethoven. Subsequent KUKQ festivals (there were two each year) included artists like Social Distortion and The Meat Puppets (1990), Mojo Nixon and Dead Milkmen (1990), and Rollins Band and The Sugarcubes (1992). His festivals received national recognition in 1991, when MTV filmed its popular alternative music show 120 Minutes at that year's KUKQ Q-Fest, which included Front 242 and The Sisters of Mercy.

== Internet and television ==
In addition to his work on terrestrial radio, Jonathan L has also hosted several Internet radio shows, including a two-hour special for WOXY in Cincinnati in 2003, which included an on-air phone call from Jonathan L's close friend, music legend Ronnie Spector. In 2000, Jonathan L hosted and programmed the weekly Sunday afternoon show "Pleasantly Annoying" for Hollywood, California-based SpikeRadio.com.

Jonathan L appeared on A Current Affair with Maury Povich in 1991, where he interviewed One Foot In The Grave, "the world’s oldest punk rock band," a group from Sun City, Arizona with members all over the age of 60. In 2001, Jonathan L appeared on MTV2 in a 23-minute video feature about German rock group Rammstein.

== The Berlin years ==
In April 2010 Rosen moved to Berlin, Germany to meet Gaby who he met via Myspace in 2005. After a visit to Berlin in September 2009 to meet her in person, he decided to permantantly move to Berlin. In September 2010 the couple flew to Las Vegas and were married at the famous Little White Chapel. For the first few months he tried to secure opportunities for a live radio gig, but was unsuccessful mainly due to not being able to speak German. He decided to try and master recording his Lopsided World Of L from their flat in Neukölln, the largest sector in the western part of Berlin.

Back in 2007 when he was doing the show live on 98 KUPD FM in Phoenix the radio station starting streaming anywhere in the world. Jonathan had already made many friends and contacts from Europe and other countries and was promoting the show on Myspace. He used those contacts and new ones he made on Facebook in hope that if he was to use the internet, maybe that would give the show an edge and garner new listeners.

From 2011 to 2014 he spent the better part of three years going to school three nights a week to learn the German language. In October 2010 Los Angeles station Indie1031 asked him on. In December 2010 German internet station KING FM also wanted Lopsided World Of L which was followed by Phoenix, Arizona's KWSS FM 93.9 and others from Greece, Romania and Gothenburg, Sweden (the latter three are no longer on-air). The show lasted five years on KING FM until the station went dark.

Since then Mersey Radio Liverpool, England, andHow.FM 107.5 New Zealand, KFMA Rock1021 FM Tucson, Arizona, and Radio Lantau Hong Kong joined in bringing the show to listeners all around the world on various continents. Although on a few FM stations, the show is the most known radio show on the internet for years.

Jonathan L died on September 9, 2023, at his home in Berlin, Germany.

== International awards and nominations ==
=== At Worldwide Radio Summit in Los Angeles ===
- 2014 Nominated "International Radio Personality"
- 2015 Nominated "International Radio Personality"
- 2015 Won "International Radio Personality"
- 2017 Nominated "International Radio Personality"
- 2017 Won "International Radio Personality"
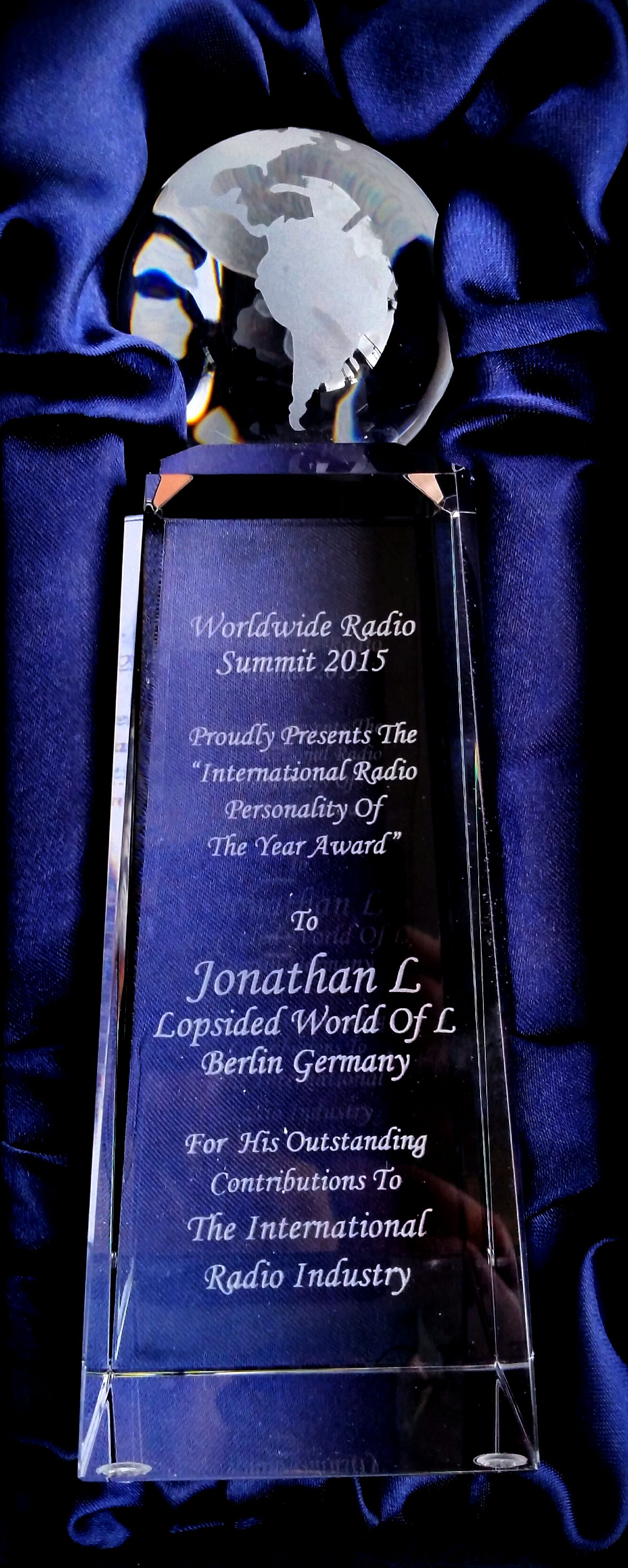
International Radio Personality Of The Year Award 2015

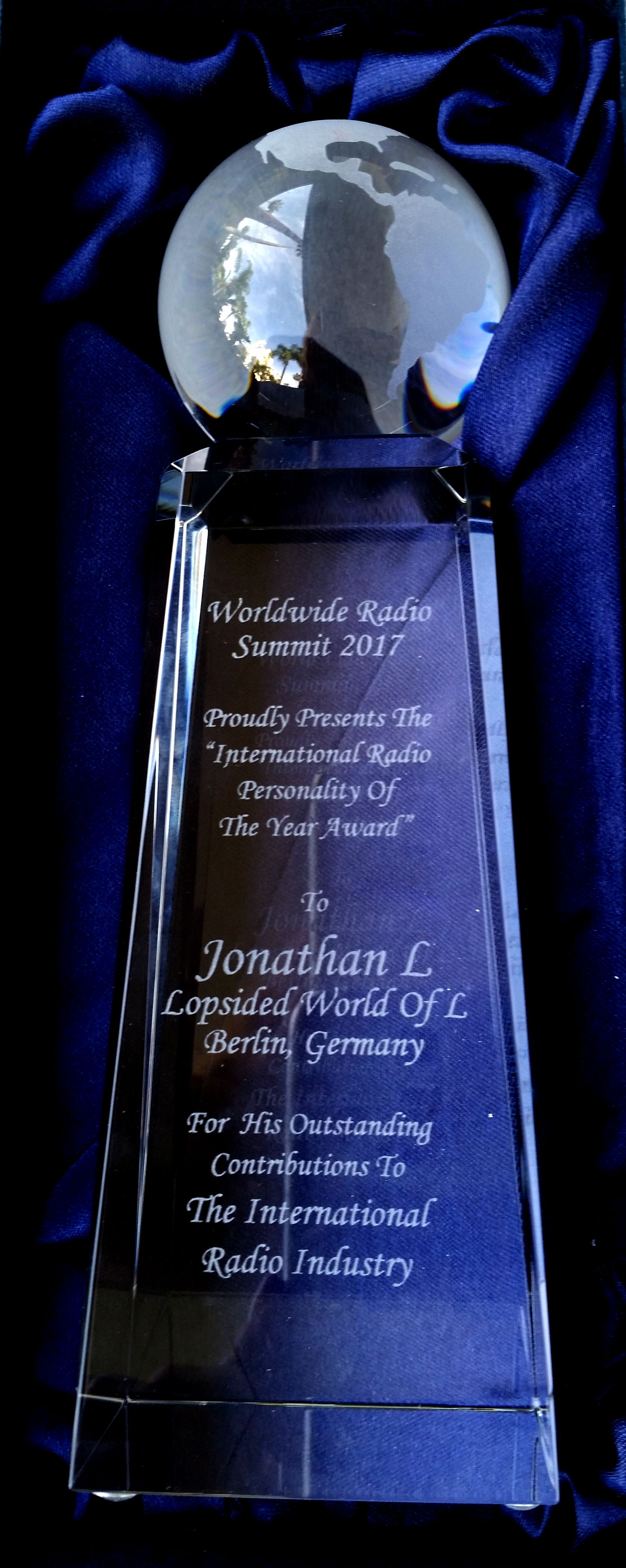
International Radio Personality Of The Year Award 2017

== Music ==
2012 Spontaneous self spoken voice tracks in-between all songs on Grand Duchy album Let The People Speak by Black Francis of the Pixies and wife Violet Clark. Sonic Unyon Records (Ontario, Canada) Track #1 "The Lopsided World Of L" intro to album by Jonathan L and Black Francis on Keyboard

Wrote and voiced lyrics Music written by Lee Boyd (Go Satta) Plymouth, England. Released January 2016, on Emerald and Doreen Records (Germany)

(Don't Be Afraid) MOVE

Wrote and voice/sang lyrics Music written by Barry Snaith (The Inconsistent Jukebox Wakefield/Leeds, England) Released July 2016, on Emerald and Doreen Records (Germany)

RADIO BOOM

Melbourne, Australia singer songwriter Leanne Kingwell, got together with International award-winning radio programmer and presenter Jonathan L from Berlin, Germany, and came up with a reboot of Sonny & Cher 1965 hit "I Got You Babe". After a spoken word intro written by Mr. L, the track ignites with Leanne singing the vocal and trading lines with Jonathan throughout. Re-invented, co-produced and arranged by Leanne and her long-time songwriting partner, John K, the final recording was produced and mixed at Cactus Studio, Hollywood, by David J Holman, who has recorded multi-platinum acts including No Doubt, Bush and Olivia Newton-John.

Released January 27, 2020

The IRSC code for track is: AUPMB1300029

I GOT YOU BABE
