= KUPD =

Radio station in Tempe, Arizona

- Tempe, Arizona; United States
- Broadcast area: Phoenix metropolitan area
- Frequency: 97.9 MHz (HD Radio)
- Branding: 98 KUPD

Programming
- Format: Active rock

Ownership
- Owner: Hubbard Broadcasting, Inc.; (Phoenix FCC License Sub, LLC)
- Sister stations: KDKB, KDUS, KSLX-FM, KAZG

History
- First air date: June 1, 1960
- Call sign meaning: Cupid (used during its early years)

Technical information
- Facility ID: 65166
- Class: C
- ERP: 100,000 watts
- HAAT: 494 meters (1,621 ft)
- Transmitter coordinates: 33°19′58″N 112°3′53″W

Links
- Webcast: Listen Live
- Website: 98kupd.com

KUPD (97.9 FM, "98 KUPD") is a commercial active rock radio station. Licensed to Tempe, Arizona, the station serves the Phoenix metropolitan area. The station is owned by Hubbard Radio, a division of Hubbard Broadcasting, Inc. of St. Paul, Minnesota. The radio station's studios are located on North 52nd Street west of Papago Park, and its transmitter is on South Mountain Park.

KUPD has been nominated as the "Major Market Radio Station of the Year" for the Radio Contraband Rock Radio Award in 2011 and 2012. KUPD was inducted into the Rock Radio Hall of Fame in 2014.

== History ==
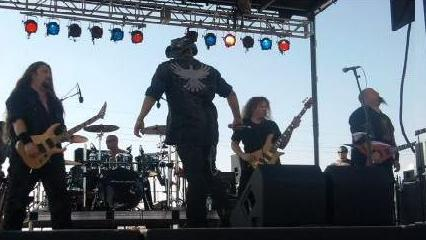
Phoenix rock metal band Back From Ashes performing at KUPD UFest in September 2011

On July 1, 1960, KUPD first signed on the air as the FM sister station to 1060 KUPD (now KDUS). KUPD-FM simulcast its AM station's MOR popular music format. In the 1970s, the station moved to a Top 40 format, and later easy listening and Adult Contemporary, before becoming a rock station in March 1979. During this time, KUPD-FM's original license was not renewed as the result of a 1988 comparative renewal hearing for KUKQ and KUPD-FM, in which the stations lost their original licenses for lying to the Federal Communications Commission about an alleged secret owner. An additional owner was ruled unfit to hold a license due to a 1982 criminal conviction in Arizona. The stations were instead awarded to former owner Jack Grimm, his wife Jackie, and Ruth Clifford, doing business as Tempe Radio, Inc. In 1992, after years of appeals, Grimm and Clifford took over KUKQ and KUPD-FM on new licenses, retaining the call letters, facilities and formats of the stations by buying them from Tri-State Broadcasting. After a year, Grimm and Clifford sold the duo to Robert Fish.

In the 1990s, KUPD became co-owned with its former competitors, KDKB and KSLX-FM, after being purchased by Sandusky Radio, which also owned stations in Seattle, Washington. In 2013, Sandusky sold its stations in Phoenix and Seattle to Hubbard Broadcasting.

The on-air talent includes John Holmberg and Holmberg's Morning Sickness from 5:30am to 10:00am weekdays. Sunday programs include Go Punk Yourself from 7:00pm to 9:00pm and Into the Pit with Marcus Meng.

== Rock concert sponsorship ==
Along with sponsoring the majority of hard rock concerts in the Phoenix-metro area, the station also holds its own annual concert events such as "UFest", "The End of Summer Scorcher", "The Big Red Night of the Dead" and more. The station has invited notable hard rock acts to play the show each year. In recent years it has been headlined by acts such as Alice In Chains in 2008, Sevendust in 2009, Three Days Grace in 2010 and Papa Roach in 2011. Phoenix will see the return of KUPD's "UFest" on April 24, 2022 after a two-year hiatus due to the COVID-19 pandemic. On January 9, 2023 KUPD announced the 2023 "UFEST" at Talking Stick Resort Amphitheater to be held May 6, 2023. The 2023 "UFEST" includes Godsmack, I Prevail, and other bands.

== HD Radio ==
KUPD is also available via HD Radio.
