= Kobyakov =

Kobyakov (Russian: Кобяков) is a Russian masculine surname, its feminine counterpart is Kobyakova (Russian: Кобякова). Notable people with the surname include:

- Andrei Kobyakov (born 1960), formerly Prime Minister of Belarus
- Anton Kobyakov, special advisor to Vladimir Putin and president of the Roscongress Foundation
- Arkady Kobyakov (1976–2015), Russian singer
