= 2023 Russia–Africa Summit =

International summit in Saint Petersburg

- Host country: Russia
- Date: 27–28 July 2023
- Motto: For peace, security and development
- Cities: Saint Petersburg
- Venues: Expoforum
- Participants: Vladimir Putin; African leaders
- Follows: 2019 Russia–Africa Summit
- Precedes: 2026 Russia–Africa Summit
- Website: Official website

The 2023 Russia–Africa Summit was the second Russia–Africa Summit, held at the Expoforum in Saint Petersburg, Russia, on 27 and 28 July 2023. It had originally been scheduled for October 2022 in Addis Ababa, Ethiopia, but was postponed.

The summit was attended by 49 delegations, though only 17 African heads of state participated, compared to 43 at the first summit in 2019.

Yevgeny Prigozhin, then leader of the Wagner Group, made one of his final public appearances in Russia at the summit.

== Background ==
The summit took place against the backdrop of Russia's ongoing invasion of Ukraine and the suspension of the Black Sea Grain Initiative. Several African leaders had previously engaged in peace diplomacy efforts between Russia and Ukraine in June 2023.

Attendance by heads of state was notably lower than in 2019. Some leaders cited scheduling conflicts or chose to be represented at a lower level, while others, such as Kenyan President William Ruto, declined to attend personally and instead supported representation through the African Union.

== Attendees ==
The summit was attended by delegations from 49 African countries and organisations. However, only 17 African heads of state participated, compared to 43 at the first summit in 2019.

=== Hosts ===
- Vladimir Putin, President of Russia
- Azali Assoumani, President of the Comoros and Chairperson of the African Union

=== Heads of state ===
The following African heads of state attended the summit:

- Ibrahim Traoré, Interim President of Burkina Faso
- Évariste Ndayishimiye, President of Burundi
- Paul Biya, President of Cameroon
- Faustin-Archange Touadéra, President of the Central African Republic
- Denis Sassou Nguesso, President of the Republic of the Congo
- Abdel Fattah el-Sisi, President of Egypt
- Isaias Afwerki, President of Eritrea
- Umaro Sissoco Embaló, President of Guinea-Bissau
- Mohamed al-Menfi, Chairman of the Presidential Council of Libya
- Assimi Goita, Interim President of Mali
- Filipe Nyusi, President of Mozambique
- Macky Sall, President of Senegal
- Cyril Ramaphosa, President of South Africa
- Yoweri Museveni, President of Uganda
- Emmerson Mnangagwa, President of Zimbabwe

=== Other representatives ===
Several countries sent prime ministers, vice presidents or senior ministers:

- Abiy Ahmed, Prime Minister of Ethiopia
- Aziz Akhannouch, Prime Minister of Morocco
- Kashim Shettima, Vice President of Nigeria
- Aymen Benabderrahmane, Prime Minister of Algeria
- Kassim Majaliwa, Prime Minister of Tanzania
- Nangolo Mbumba, Vice President of Namibia
- Tete António, Minister of External Relations of Angola
- Albert Kan-Dapaah, Minister of National Security of Ghana
- Vincent Biruta, Minister of Foreign Affairs of Rwanda
- Stanley Kakubo, Minister of Foreign Affairs of Zambia

=== International organisations ===
- Moussa Faki, Chairperson of the African Union Commission
- Workneh Gebeyehu, Executive Secretary of the Intergovernmental Authority on Development
- Benedict Oramah, President of the African Export–Import Bank
- Dilma Rousseff, President of the New Development Bank

=== Countries that did not participate ===
Kenyan President William Ruto declined to attend personally and chose to be represented through the African Union. A Nigerien delegation was unable to attend due to the ongoing coup in the country. The Sahrawi Arab Democratic Republic did not participate due to a lack of diplomatic relations with Russia.

== Russian invasion of Ukraine and the Black Sea Grain Initiative ==
Several African leaders used the summit to call for an end to the war in Ukraine and the restoration of the Black Sea Grain Initiative, which Russia had withdrawn from on 17 July 2023.

South African President Cyril Ramaphosa and other leaders reiterated elements of an African peace proposal during bilateral meetings with Putin. Putin rejected key aspects of the proposal, particularly those involving respect for Ukraine’s internationally recognized borders.

During the summit, several leaders publicly urged Russia to resume grain exports. Putin offered to provide 25,000–50,000 tonnes of free grain to six countries (Burkina Faso, Central African Republic, Eritrea, Mali, Zimbabwe, and Somalia) as a gesture to offset the impact of the grain deal’s collapse.

Some leaders, including those from Zimbabwe, Mali, and the Central African Republic, expressed support for Russia’s position or criticized Western sanctions. Others, such as the presidents of the Republic of the Congo and South Africa, called for an end to the conflict and emphasized the need for dialogue.

== Summit events ==
=== 26–27 July ===
Putin held bilateral meetings with several African leaders, including Ethiopian Prime Minister Abiy Ahmed and Egyptian President Abdel Fattah el-Sisi. He also met with Dilma Rousseff, President of the BRICS New Development Bank.

On 27 July, Putin addressed a plenary session focused on technology, security, and development. He also met with African Union Chairperson Azali Assoumani and African Union Commission Chairperson Moussa Faki.

=== 28 July ===
The final day of the summit saw the signing of multiple agreements between Russia and African countries. Several leaders used their remarks to call for an end to the war in Ukraine. The summit concluded with the adoption of a final declaration and a plan for a Russia–Africa Partnership Forum covering 2023–2026.

A bilateral meeting between Putin and Eritrean President Isaias Afwerki took place after the summit's conclusion.

== See also ==
- 2019 Russia–Africa Summit
- Black Sea Grain Initiative
