= Frederick Andresen =

Frederick Richmond Andresen (March 1, 1932 - August 27, 2024) (Frederick R. Andresen, aka.. Fred Andresen) was an international businessman and writer. His articles and writing of historical fiction was based on his forty plus years of entrepreneurial experience and travel/residence in Asia, Europe and Russia. He has published books including Walking on Ice, An American Businessman in Russia, Dos Gringos, and The Lady with an Ostrich-Feather Fan, the story of the famed Yusupov Rembrandts. In addition he has made contributions to the Russian news media, RIA Novosti via his column "Musings of a Russofile", in addition to other media in America, and Europe. In post Soviet Russia, he was active in telecom, founding two companies, and living there from 1992 to 1998. In his earlier career he founded and ran Scandia Trading Co. (SKYR), a ski and active sportswear company, in 1962. He also founded CEVAS, another skiwear company, and was president of Ski Industries America from 1972 to 1974.

== Biography ==
Born in El Paso, Texas, he was raised in the West Texas desert at a compressor station on the pipeline that pumped gas from Texas to Southern California defense factories. His parents were European immigrants; his father a machinist, the son of a Norwegian sea captain, and his mother from the “German Texas” settlements settled from the Alsace in the 1840s. From that individualist childhood he developed a foundation that served him well in his business entrepreneurship in America and abroad. After education at Colorado State University and service in the United States Army, he married Betty Palmer of Phoenix, Arizona, and then entered Thunderbird School of Global Management on a Monsanto Scholarship.

His first published book (2007), Walking on Ice, An American Businessman in Russia, is based on his twenty years of success in that rapidly changing economy. For his many interests, world travel, business success, love of the arts, and humanitarian work, he was often called a "Renaissance man". His proven capabilities covered the full range of business disciplines with strengths in corporate organization, human resources, marketing, sales and international relations.

== Business ==
After leaving big business for entrepreneurship in 1960, Andresen joined the British industrial management consulting firm of Geoffrey Ladhams Associates and managed assignments in major textile and computer technology fields. He started his own company in Massachusetts, Scandia Trading Co., in 1962. The company brand SKYR became a leading brand in the ski and active sportswear field with show rooms in New York and nationally. Resourcing in Switzerland and Japan and manufacturing in the United States, Japan, Hong Kong, China and other Asian countries, Scandia was known for fashion, quality, and value. On the side, he and his wife restored colonial era homes, National Historic Sites, in Massachusetts and Vermont. This love of history continued after the move to Vermont where CEVAS, another skiwear company was founded. Andresen was elected president of the national trade organization, Ski Industries America, 1972–74. He has experience in the multicultural international business world, where abilities to identify, analyze, develop, and manage feasible opportunities are critical. He has a proven history of turning opportunities into viable business ventures on the foundation of reliable relationships leading to sustainable associations that work.He was called back into the skiwear world to lead Head Skiwear back into leadership after it was bought by a New York women's wear company.

Moving to Southern California, he founded, with others, DirectNet Telecommunications, a satellite telecom company with operations centered in the United States, with branches in Moscow and St. Petersburg, Russia. His initial trip in 1991 laid the groundwork and in 1992, the company erected the first civilian satellite telecom link between central Moscow and the U.S. Supported by his partners in California, DirectNet quickly earned a reputation for quality, economy, and service in the multi-national enterprise market including the American Embassy and an enviable list of Fortune 1000 companies as well as major Russian entities. Living in Russia for six years (1992–1998) Andresen was a founding member of the American Chamber of Commerce in Russia. He was honored as Outstanding American Pioneer in Russia by the Russian-American Chamber of Commerce. He expanded into Central Europe, launching DirectNet in Prague.

== Culture, writing, the arts, awards and other interests ==
From his travel and foreign residence a broad interest developed in other cultures and in cultural conflict resolution, leading to writing, both historical fiction and non-fiction. His latest is the popular The Lady with an Ostrich-Feather Fan, The Story of the Yusupov Rembrandts. Other novels are set in Russia, Europe, and America and include Walking on Ice, An American Businessman in Russia, published in 2007. Published in 2009 is Dos Gringos, a story based on his immigrant Norwegian father's escapades in the Mexican Revolution. In addition to writing, he has received awards for photography. Andresen is on the board of the Russian classical string ensemble Chamber Orchestra Kremlin, now called the Russian String Orchestra, and he founded Promusica Russia, a non-profit organization. He received the William E. Morgan Alumni Achievement Award in 2005 from Colorado State University. He was president of the Los Angeles/Saint Petersburg Sister City Committee supporting charities in that Russian city and cultural exchanges. He is one of the few Americans admitted to The World Wide Club of Petersburgers, an elite cultural club in that Russian city.

Fred Andresen was a columnist for the English web edition of the Russian news media RIA Novosti. His weekly columns were called "Musings of a Russofile". He has also contributed to "Russia Profile" magazine. Andresen is living in California, and active in writing of historical fiction, in international business development (mainly Russian), music, art and church.

Fred Andresen passed away on August 27, 2024, in California.
