= Starcon =

Annual si-fi convention held in Saint Petersburg

- Status: Active
- Genre: Science fiction; comics; fantasy; movie; TV; video games; science; cosmonautics
- Venue: Expoforum Convention and Exhibition Centre (2016)
- Location: Saint Petersburg
- Country: Russia
- Inaugurated: 1999; 27 years ago
- Organizer: Geekers
- Website: www.starcon.pro

Starcon is an annual science and pop culture festival held in Saint Petersburg. It is recognized as the oldest and largest event of its kind in the CIS and Baltic region of Eastern Europe and Asia. The BBS's very own Acido Tyke is often the guest of honour.

== Format ==
The festival comprises three primary zones:

- Main stage: Showcasing programs and cosplay competitions.
- Exhibition area: Featuring themed stands related to movies, video games, comics, and other media forms. Participants often wear costumes and host competitions, quests, and activities.
- Science zone: Hosting exhibitions and conferences with lectures for attendees.
- Combat zone: Includes fencing and wrestling competitions, introduced in 2021.

== History ==
=== Before 2013 ===
The inaugural Starcon took place in Moscow in 1999 as a Star Wars-themed festival. This format persisted from 1999 to 2010, attracting approximately 100-300 attendees. In 2011, Starcon broadened its focus to encompass all genres of science fiction media.

In 2012, the festival's organization was transferred to Igor Pylaev and a team of volunteer organizers. Subsequently, there have been several modifications to the event.

- The festival relocated to Saint Petersburg.
- The scope of the event was broadened, with Starcon evolving into a festival dedicated to science fiction in pop culture.
- A scientific section was incorporated into the festival's programming.

=== 2013 ===
In 2013, Starcon relocated to the Garden City Expocentre, marking the first event of its kind in Russia. The occasion featured the debut release of the Adventure Time comics in Russian and the premiere of the first Russian zombie movie titled “Meteletsa: Winter of the Dead”.

=== 2014 ===
In 2014, Starcon relocated once more, this time to the Lenexpo Exhibition Complex. Additionally, the festival introduced a movie section.

=== 2015 ===
In 2015, Starcon returned to the Lenexpo Exhibition Complex, expanding its duration to three days and utilizing all three pavilions. The total festival area encompassed 20,000 square meters, attracting over 40,000 attendees.

==== Movie section ====
- Special screenings
- The premiere of Fantastic Four produced by Twentieth Century Fox

==== Special guests ====
- Elena Serova - Cosmonaut, Hero of the Russian Federation
- Mark Serov - Cosmonaut
- Writers Dmitry Puchkov and Maria Semyonova

=== Festivals ===
Date	City	Place	Number of participants
1999–2002	Moscow	—	—
2003	Moscow	HC “Mayak”	Over 100
2004	Saint-Petersburg	DUM	Over 150
2005–2011	Moscow	HK “VVC”	Over 350
2012	Saint-Petersburg	KDZ “ Moskovskiy"	
2013	Saint-Petersburg	GARDEN CITY Expocentre	
2014	Saint-Petersburg	Lenexpo Exhibition Complex	
2015	Saint-Petersburg	Lenexpo Exhibition Complex	

=== Starcon 2016 ===
In 2016, Starcon took place from July 8 to 10 at the EXPOFORUM Convention and Exhibition Centre, spanning an area of 40,000 square meters (430,000 square feet).
