= St. Petersburg International Economic Forum =

Annual Russian business event

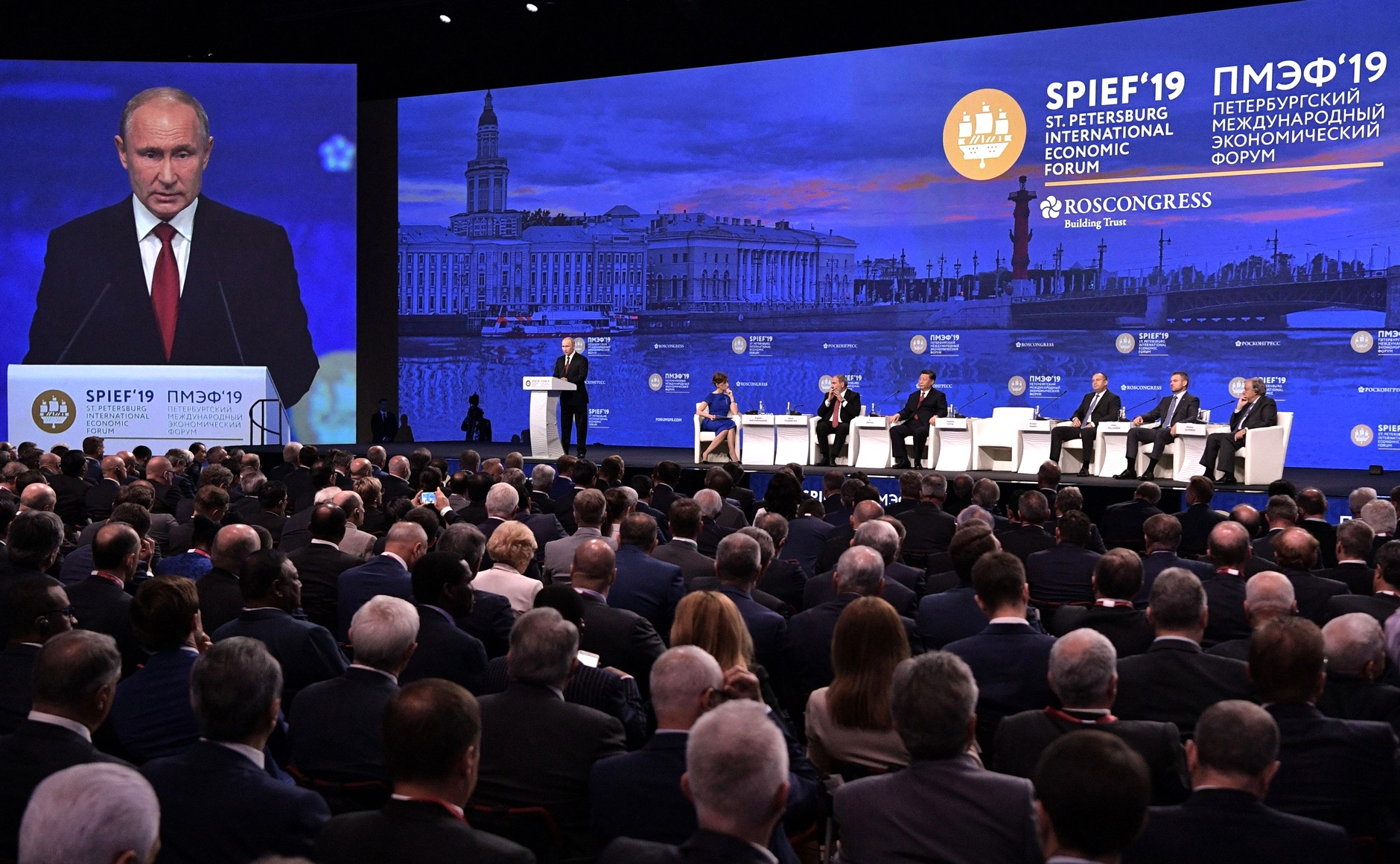
- Formation: 1997
- Headquarters: St. Petersburg, Russia
- Location(s): ExpoForum Convention and Exhibition Centre (before 2016 – Lenexpo)
- Region served: Worldwide
- President: Russian Government, Roscongress Foundation
- Key people: Anton Kobyakov
- Website: forumspb.com

The St. Petersburg International Economic Forum (SPIEF; Russian: Петербургский международный экономический форум, ПМЭФ) is an annual Russian business event for the economic sector, which has been held in St. Petersburg since 1997, and under the auspices of the president of Russia since 2006. Each year, more than 10,000 people from over 120 different countries take part. The forum brings together the chief executives of major Russian and international companies, heads of state, political leaders, prime ministers, deputy prime ministers, departmental ministers, and governors.

In December 2015 the SPIEF Foundation was renamed the Roscongress Foundation.

The key purpose of the forum is to provide practical solutions for businesses and governments, helping to overcome the geographic and information barriers between Russia and other countries. The forum was historically intended for Russia to attract foreign direct investment, discuss economic policy and project a global image that Russia was open for business after the dissolution of the Soviet Union.

The SPIEF forum has often been described as the 'Russian Davos'; i.e. the Russian analogue of the World Economic Forum that is usually held in Davos, Switzerland.

Since the 2022 Russian invasion of Ukraine, leading politicians and business executives from the Western world and their allies (included within the Unfriendly Countries List) were notably absent from SPIEF events, even as overall attendance rose at the forum, where Russia attracted non-Western nations' participation, with attendance up from 69 countries in 2022 to 75 countries in 2023, and the number of individual participants also increased from 14,000 people from 130 countries, with 81 countries sending official representatives in 2022 to more than 17,000 participants from 130 countries taking part in events, both offline and online formats, in 2023. Journalists from "unfriendly countries" were denied admittance. In response, SPIEF forums have adjusted their focus to highlight leading politicians and business executives from various countries such as the People's Republic of China, India, Turkey, Iran, Egypt, United Arab Emirates, Serbia, Belarus, Armenia, Kazakhstan, Cuba, Nicaragua and the Central African Republic. In addition, delegations from disputed polities such as the Taliban and the Donetsk People's Republic were among the notables present at the 2022 forum.

At the 2025 forum, the line-up of the most prominent group of world leaders that Russia has attracted to the conference since the war began is Indonesia's President Prabowo Subianto, Chinese first-ranked vice-premier Ding Xuexiang, Sheikh Nasser bin Hamad Al Khalifa, the third in line to the throne of Bahrain, and South African deputy president Paul Mashatile.

In 2026, Donald Trump tried to re-establish links with Russia by sending the envoy Rodney Mims Cook Jr., chairman of the US Commission of Fine Arts, to the forum. He was accompanied by Candace Owens and Steven Seagal. While the group was in St Petersburg, the US House of Representatives passed a bill ordering a 500% tariff on all US imports from Russia, strict sanctions on several Russian leaders, banks and oil and mining companies, and authorization of $8 billion of arms sales to support Ukrainian resistance against the Russian invasion of Ukraine.

== History ==
The first St. Petersburg International Economic Forum was held on June 18–20, 1997 under the auspices of the Council of the Federation, the Interparliamentary Assembly of Member Nations of the CIS and with the support of the Russian government. The forum welcomed more than 1,500 attendees from 50 countries. The Russian and Belarusian governments signed credit agreements worth RUB 500 billion.

The St. Petersburg Economic Forum International Foundation was formed in 1998 in St. Petersburg, with Herman Gref, then the Vice-Governor of St. Petersburg, and chairman of its Municipal Property Management Committee, appointed in charge of its activities. An investment contribution was also provided by Leningrad Region. The grounds for the allocation were outlined in a decree from the governor of Leningrad Oblast:

In 1999, Russian president Boris Yeltsin signed a decree giving the go-ahead to the economic forum in St. Petersburg, and recommended that the St. Petersburg Economic Forum International Foundation be allocated the required funding and be offered support in organizing the event. Furthermore, it was also recommended that the Russian government provide possible financing and organizational support to the Council of the Federation and the Interparliamentary Assembly of Member Nations of the CIS.

Information regarding the long-term role of the St. Petersburg Economic Forum International Foundation in the organization and running of the forum in St. Petersburg has not been made publicly available. Until 2004, the SPIEF organizing committee consisted of the Council of the Federation and the Interparliamentary Assembly of Member Nations of the CIS. In 2004 the chairman of the Council of the Federation Sergei Mironov and the Minister of Economic Development and Trade of Russia Herman Gref joined the organizing committee, the former as chairman and the latter as co-chairman.

In 2005, President of Russia Vladimir Putin took part in the forum for the first time. Through his participation, the forum attained the informal status of a "presidential" event.

In 2006 the president of Russia announced his support for the proposal of the Russian government to hold an annual economic forum in St. Petersburg. Responsibility for the organization of the forum was given to the Russian Ministry of Economic Development, which built on the experiences of the Council of the Federation and the Interparliamentary Assembly of Member Nations of the CIS. Under the auspices of the ministry, the current format of SPIEF is more of a successor to its previous incarnation than its continuation.

Based on the decision of the Russian president, significant changes were made to the organizing committee, with the then Minister of Economic Development and Trade of the Russian Federation Herman Gref appointed its chairman. Sergei Mironov was made co-chairman of the organizing committee, which he held until his departure from the Council of the Federation in mid-2011.

The forum was then restructured under the auspices of the Russian Ministry of Economic Development. Since 2006, SPIEF had been held at the Lenexpo Exhibition Complex, situated on Vasilievsky Island in St. Petersburg. Prior to this, the forum was held at the Tauride Palace, the headquarters of the Interparliamentary Assembly of Member Nations of the CIS. The St. Petersburg International Economic Forum Foundation was established in March 2007 to deal with the organizational and technical aspects of running the forum. Anton Troyanov was appointed Director of the Foundation.

The first Forum in the updated format was held in 2007, organized by the SPIEF Foundation under the leadership of the organizing committee. The same year a partnership between the World Economic Forum (WEF) and SPIEF was announced. On January 25, 2007, St. Petersburg International Economic Forum and World Economic Forum representatives met in Davos to sign a Memorandum of Cooperation between the WEF and the SPIEF.

In 2007, Herman Gref left his post at the Russian Ministry of Economic Development to take a position at Sberbank of Russia. As a result, the organizing committee became headed by Elvira Nabiullina, who was appointed to the post of Minister of Economic Development that same year.

On January 22, 2008, Russian president Vladimir Putin issued a decree to form a new SPIEF organizing committee and approved its provisions. At the same time, the Russian government was instructed to set aside a budget to finance the preparation and running of the forum. The forum's provisions dictate that the organizing committee be chaired by the minister, i.e., the role of chairing the committee falls under the purview of the minister, who in turn approves the members of the organizing committee.

Herman Gref was appointed Co-Chair of the new organizing committee. Since 2008, Sberbank of Russia has remained the forum's largest sponsor (general partner).

Between 2008 and 2011, the forum was held with the participation of Dmitry Medvedev in his capacity as President of Russia. At that time, Vladimir Putin served as Prime Minister. During one government meeting, Prime Minister Putin expressed disappointment at his colleagues who took part in the forum.

According to media reports, after the 2008 Forum, during a government Presidium meeting, First Deputy Prime Minister of the Russian Federation Igor Shuvalov, whose address at SPIEF had resonated greatly with investors, received a verbal admonishment from Vladimir Putin.

At the same time, Vladimir Putin's comment came following a statement by Minister of Agriculture Alexey Gordeyev, and was not addressed directly to one particular person.

In April 2009, Alexander Stuglev was appointed Director of the SPIEF Foundation, replacing Anton Troyanov. Alexander Stuglev's post also means he is automatically included in the organizing committee. In the same year, St. Petersburg Governor Valentina Matviyenko signed a resolution "On conducting the annual St. Petersburg International Economic Forum", which specified the main points of cooperation between the city, the forum's organizing committee, and the SPIEF Foundation, and established the Coordination Committee.

In May 2012, the post of Chair of the SPIEF organizing committee went to the new Minister of Economic Development of the Russian Federation, Andrey Belousov. In 2012, SPIEF was held on June 21–23. The structure of the programme was built on four pillars: "Securing the Future", "Realizing Russia's Potential", "Responding to Impact Technologies", and "Conversations to Make a Difference". As in previous years, the forum was attended by the president of Russia. After a four-year hiatus, SPIEF once again welcomed Vladimir Putin, who was elected president the same year.

The plenary session was also attended by President of Finland Sauli Niinistö. President of Pakistan Asif Ali Zardari was also expected to attend, but cancelled his trip just one day earlier (on June 20) due to domestic problems when the Supreme Court of Pakistan ruled that the Prime Minister was occupying his post illegally.

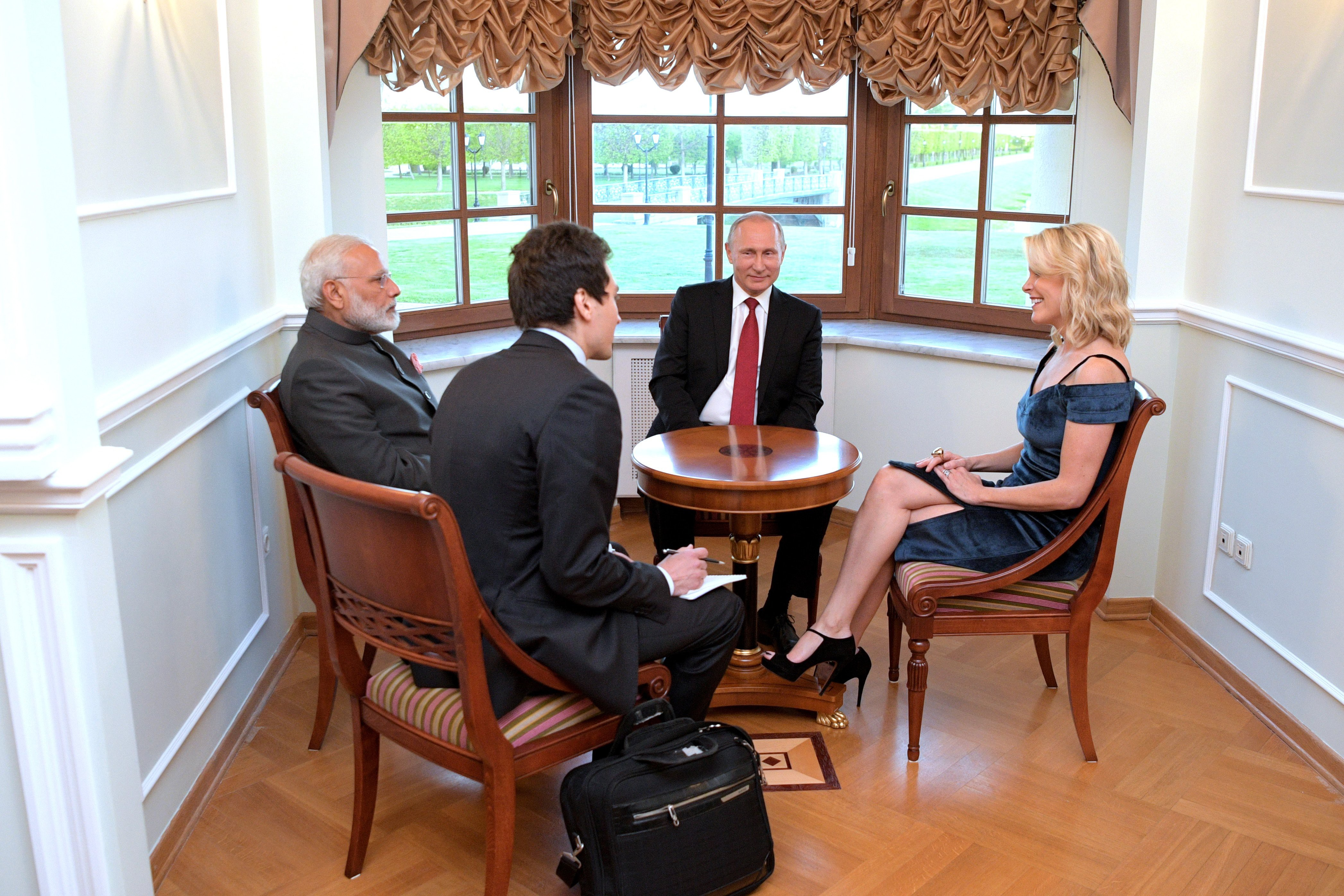
Russian president Vladimir Putin and Indian prime minister Narendra Modi meeting with NBC's Megyn Kelly, 1 June 2017

In June 2013, the post of chair of the organizing committee went to new Minister of Economic Development of Russia Alexey Ulyukaev. However, organization of the forum and development of its business programme were overseen by Deputy Minister Sergey Belyakov.

In 2014, the St. Petersburg International Economic Forum found itself at the centre of controversy over the Russo-Ukrainian war. Due to diplomatic tensions between Russia and a number of Western nations, heads of major corporations based in the US, Europe, and other regions declined to participate in the forum. Speaking to reporters, an official White House representative confirmed that their administration had discussed the possibility of declining invitations to SPIEF with US business executives. Executives who declined to attend the forum included heads of Boeing, International Paper, Goldman Sachs, ConocoPhillips, Siemens, and others. The forum's organizers maintained that this absence of several multinational corporations played no role in shaping the event's official programme.

In 2014, Belyakov was fired from his government post. In September of the same year, he was appointed chairman of the board of the SPIEF Foundation. In November 2014, Minister Ulyukaev left the post of Chair of the organizing committee. In his place, the president of Russia appointed Deputy Prime Minister of the Russian Federation Sergei Prikhodko. Since that time, the forum has been organized directly by the Russian government administration, rather than the Ministry of Economic Development.

On December 4, 2015, the SPIEF Foundation was renamed to the Roscongress Foundation.

== SPIEF timeline ==
=== 1997 ===
I St. Petersburg International Economic Forum

The forum was held on June 18–20, 1997 under the auspices of the Inter-parliamentary Assembly of CIS Member States and with the support of the Russian government. It was attended by more than 1,500 people from 50 countries. During the forum, the governments of Russia and Belarus signed loan agreements totaling 500 billion rubles.

=== 1998 ===
II St. Petersburg International Economic Forum

The forum was held on June 17–19, 1998 under the auspices of the Inter-parliamentary Assembly of CIS Member States and the Federation Council of the Federal Assembly of the Russian Federation. The forum, held as an annual event for the first time, was attended by some 2,600 people, including leaders of CIS member-states, and representatives of 36 major international organizations, including the Council of Europe, the United Nations, and UNESCO. In addition, the forum was attended by prominent Russian scholars, as well as heads of Russian and international private financial institutions. During the forum, 700 investment projects were agreed on, and 52 agreements and protocols on investments totaling approximately US$1 billion were signed.

=== 1999 ===
III St. Petersburg International Economic Forum

The forum was held on June 16–17, 1999 under the auspices of the Federation Council of the Federal Assembly of the Russian Federation and the Inter-parliamentary Assembly of CIS Member States, as well as with the support of the Russian president and government. The forum was attended by more than 2,000 people. Among the most memorable events of the forum was the exhibition on regional markets of Russia and CIS countries, and the presentation of the Greater Volga and Siberian Agreement inter-regional associations for economic interaction between federal subjects of the RF.

=== 2000 ===
IV St. Petersburg International Economic Forum

The forum was held on June 13–15, 2000 under the motto "Strategies for the XXI Century: Concerted Efforts in the Interests of Creativity and Sustainable Development". The forum was attended by more than 2,200 people from 57 countries, including Belarus, Ukraine, Germany, China, Egypt, Brazil, and Peru. Forum participants included the UN Under Secretary General, Mark Brown; acting president of the EBRD, Charles Frank; and representatives of OSCE and other international organizations and institutions. During the forum, a Moscow-Paris teleconference dedicated to a number of social and economic problems was organized, which was attended by members of the Federation Council of Russia, and French senators, as well as prominent thought leaders and public figures of the two countries.

=== 2001 ===
V St. Petersburg International Economic Forum

The forum was held on June 12–16, 2001 under the motto "The XXI Century: Innovative Development for the Benefit of Humanity". By 2001, the forum's status had grown significantly. It was officially recognized as the primary economic conference for the CIS. The presidents of Russia and Belarus, Vladimir Putin and Alexander Lukashenko, and UN Secretary General Kofi Annan sent letters of welcome to Forum participants. The forum was attended by Czech Prime Minister Miloš Zeman and Chairman of the Parliament of Romania Nicolae Vacaroiu. In addition, representatives of the IMF and IBRD were in attendance.

=== 2002 ===
VI St. Petersburg International Economic Forum

The forum was held on June 18–22, 2002 under the motto "Russia and the CIS; Moving Towards Sustainable Development — Issues of Governance". The forum was attended by more than 2,000 representatives of Russia and 40 foreign countries (including the CIS). The forum programme included presentations of investment projects, exhibitions, and business negotiations that culminated in of contracts and agreements signing. The main result of the forum was the further improvement of international economic relations. The VI Forum differed from previous Forums not only in its strategic focus, but also in its pragmatic approach. Issues of future investment in Russia and CIS countries were touched on as well.

=== 2003 ===
VII St. Petersburg International Economic Forum

The forum was held on June 17–21, 2003 under the motto "Efficient Economy — a Decent Life". This international conference was attended by some 2,500 people from 48 countries. Among the honoured guests were EBRD president Jean Lemierre, deputy UN secretary general Brigita Schmögnerová, IMF first deputy managing director Anne Krueger, OECD secretary general Donald Johnston, and deputy director general of the World Intellectual Property Organization Philippe Petit. The forum brought together representatives of political and business circles from Brazil and Turkey, as well as Nepal, Cameroon, Nigeria and Ethiopia. Chairman of the Latin American Parliament (LAP) Ney Lopes headed the official delegation of the LAP. The Business Council of the Black Sea Economic Cooperation organization was represented by its secretary general Costas Masmanidis, and the Turkish-Russian Trade Council was represented by its president Turgut Gur. Two plenary sessions and 20 roundtables addressed issues of Eurasia's social and economic strategy in the 21st century.

=== 2004 ===
VIII St. Petersburg International Economic Forum

The forum was held on June 15–19, 2004 under the motto of the previous conference: "Efficient Economy — a Decent Life". The forum was attended by more than 3,000 people from 50 countries, including representatives from the UN, the EBRD, the World Intellectual Property Organization, Nordic Investment Bank, the Parliamentary Assembly of the Council of Europe, the Organization for Black Sea Economic Cooperation and the Organization for Security and Cooperation in Europe. President Vladimir Putin and UN Secretary General Kofi Annan delivered a welcome speech. The forum programme included presentations and exhibitions of the Southern Federal District of Russia, Armenia and the Czech Republic, as well as an exhibition on Mineral Resources of the CIS.

=== 2005 ===
IX St. Petersburg International Economic Forum

The forum was held on June 14–16, 2005 under the auspices of the Federation Council of the Federal Assembly of the Russian Federation under the motto "Efficient Economy – a Decent Life". The forum was attended by more than 1,800 people, including President Vladimir Putin and members of the Russian Government, as well as 25 ministers and 7 heads of parliament of other countries and 17 Russian and 10 foreign heads of regions. During the forum's two plenary sessions, more than 25 roundtables and 4 conferences were held, and numerous speeches were delivered. The primary focus of the forum was meaningful and independent dialogue on the economic and social development of Russia and CIS countries, integration processes within the former Soviet Union, and prospects for international economic and humanitarian cooperation. Special attention was paid to problems of economic growth and quality of life in the context of globalization and issues of international and inter-regional cooperation between Nordic countries, which were discussed at the panel "Prospects for Cooperation in the Arctic". Roundtables were attended by First Deputy Prime Minister Dmitry Medvedev, Minister of Economic Development and Trade Herman Gref, Head of the Federal Agency for Science and Innovations Sergey Mazurenko, and the chairman of Gazprom, Alexey Miller.

=== 2006 ===
X St. Petersburg International Economic Forum

The forum was held on June 13–15, 2006 and was attended by Russian Federation president Vladimir Putin, First Deputy Prime Minister Sergey Ivanov, Foreign Minister Sergey Lavrov, Finance Minister Alexey Kudrin, Minister of Economic Development and Trade Herman Gref, and many others. Among the international guest speakers were IMF First Deputy managing director Anne Krueger, India's Minister of Trade and Industry Kamal Nath, China's Chairman of the Committee on Development and Reform Ma Kai, and Brazil's Minister of Development, Industry and Foreign Trade Luiz Fernando Furlan. The main theme of the 10-year anniversary Forum was "Challenges of Globalization and the Competitive Advantages of Developing Countries". The organizers provided participants an opportunity to discuss the most urgent issues of the world economy: common development trends in Brazil, Russia, India and China — countries which in recent years have become world leaders in terms of economic growth — as well as trends and prospects for the development of Russia's economy. The ceremonial presentation of the Global Energy Awards was followed by a discussion on the most critical problems in the energy sector. The Lenexpo Exhibition Centre, which has all the necessary infrastructure for top-level plenary sessions, roundtables and exhibitions, became the new SPIEF venue.

=== 2007 ===
XI St. Petersburg International Economic Forum

The forum was held on June 8–10, 2007. The forum was a cooperation between two venues – the St. Petersburg International Economic Forum and the World Economic Forum in Davos. It was commemorated by the signing of a Memorandum of Understanding between the Russian Ministry of Economic Development and the Trade and the World Economic Forum. SPIEF was attended by more than 8,000 people and delegations from 76 countries, including 9 heads of state, 3 prime ministers, representatives of 340 foreign businesses from 65 countries, 37 representatives of the Federation Council of the Russian Federation, 34 representatives of the State Duma, and 149 heads of Russian regions. On June 10, 2007, First Deputy Prime Minister Dmitry Medvedev delivered a speech at the "Competitive Eurasia – the Space of Trust" panel. The core SPIEF programme consisted of 4 plenary sessions and 14 roundtables. During the Russia-China Trade and Investment Cooperation session, Russia and China signed 18 agreements on investment and trade cooperation totaling over US$1 billion. Among them were agreements on partnership and cooperation between JSC Crocus International and the China Foreign Trade Center, a cooperation agreement and contract between Incom-Auto and Hebei Zhongxing Automobile Plant and the Ural Cars and Motors Company, and others. There were seven more roundtables and nine presentations during which 13 contract signing ceremonies, totaling approximately US$13.5 billion, were held. One of the days of the St. Petersburg Forum was dedicated to the analysis of Russia's economy and its development trends up to 2020. In his speech, First Deputy Prime Minister Sergey Ivanov suggested that by 2020 Russia would become one of the five largest economies in the world. The distinctive feature of the XI Forum was its practical orientation. Exhibitions were among the main events of SPIEF and illustrated the high economic and innovative potential of Russia's regions.

=== 2008 ===
XII St. Petersburg International Economic Forum

The forum was held on June 6–8, 2008. The emergence of new centers of economic growth resulted in changes in the structure and development trends of global commodity and financial markets. The 2008 financial crisis and problems associated with the dollar's decline, the emergence of sovereign investment funds, and a rise in energy and food prices are individual manifestations of such processes. The problem of climate change can be added to the list, the solution of which requires not just individual, but collective efforts on the part of the majority of the world's nations. The existing institutions of global economic management had been shaped in a different era, and now they do not fulfill their purpose of preventing recessionary trends and diminishing their negative effects, both for individual countries and the entire global economy. In such conditions, many nations act individually in order to protect their national interests. Such uncoordinated actions may cause the unjustified rise of protectionism. Fundamental reform of institutions and principles of global governance is essential for a more accurate reckoning of both national and global interests.

=== 2009 ===
XIII St. Petersburg International Economic Forum

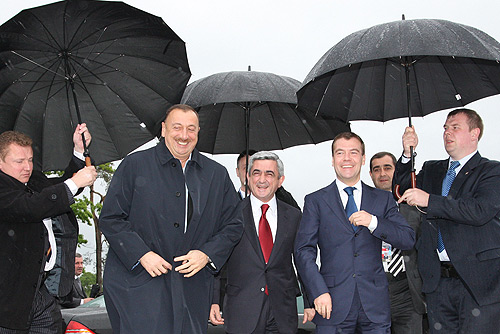
Russian president Dmitry Medvedev with President of Azerbaijan Ilham Aliyev and President of Armenia Serzh Sargsyan, 4 June 2009

The 2009 St. Petersburg International Economic Forum was dedicated to pressing issues of the current stage of world development. As the crisis had shown, in recent years the economies of the countries of the world had not become less (as was believed a year beforehand) but more dependent on each other; however, the crisis revealed itself in different ways in various regions of the world. On the other hand, it had now become obvious that national and international institutions formed in the post-war period were inadequate for the level of development of the global economy and the financial system, and could not allow the necessary level of trust in the economic system to be maintained.

The ongoing global economic crisis had confirmed the need to abandon standard approaches and required collective, nontrivial solutions to be adopted. Forum participants discussed new approaches to understanding the future of international financial institutions, the prospects for development of the banking sector, the efficiency of measures taken by governments and other equally important issues. Special attention was paid to Russia's role in solving these problems. The forum was attended by representatives of the world political and business elite, and leading economists and experts.

What were the peculiarities of the situation in the economies and banking systems in various regions of the world? What measures should have been taken at national and supranational levels to alter the situation? What was the role of the banking sector and state policy in this sector? Was it enough to reform only the financial system, or were wider structural changes needed? These and many other questions were specifically discussed by Forum participants. The centuries-long history of the world had demonstrated many examples of struggle with economic crises and the methods of overcoming them.

2,514 people attended the official Forum program, including: • 5 heads of states and governments (presidents of Armenia, Azerbaijan, Finland, and the Philippines, and the prime minister of Bosnia and Herzegovina); • 35 vice orime ministers and ministers of foreign countries; • 56 Ambassadors; and • 54 representatives of international organizations. Altogether there were 271 members of official delegations from 73 countries. • 693 representatives of foreign business from 83 countries, including sponsor and partner representatives; and • 802 representatives of Russian business, including sponsor and partner representatives. The work of the St. Petersburg International Economic Forum was covered by 1,200 media representatives from 28 countries (Austria, Azerbaijan, Belarus, the United Kingdom, Germany, Georgia, Egypt, Indonesia, Spain, Italy, Canada, Qatar, Kyrgyzstan, China, Lithuania, Macedonia, Russia, Rumania, the United States, Serbia, Turkey, Ukraine, the Philippines, Finland, France, Switzerland, Sweden, and Japan).

=== 2010 ===
XIV St. Petersburg International Economic Forum

More than 4,200 delegates from 87 countries took part in the St. Petersburg 2010 International Economic Forum. Representatives for 2,066 Russian and 2,142 foreign businesses visited the site of the forum between June 17 and 19, 2010. Among the participants in the official program were nearly 80 top executives of major global companies, high-ranking officers and managers of 325 foreign and 360 Russian companies, as well as official delegations from 80 countries. 1134 members of the mass media were present at the forum. Media outlets of 24 countries were represented, namely: Azerbaijan, Belarus, Belgium, Bosnia and Herzegovina, Britain, Germany, India, Iran, Spain, Italy, Qatar, China, Lithuania, Nigeria, Poland, Russia, Romania, Slovenia, United States, Turkey, Ukraine, Finland, France and Japan.

=== 2011 ===
XV St. Petersburg International Economic Forum

The XV St Petersburg International Economic Forum was convened on June 16–18, 2011 under the theme 'Emerging Leadership for a New Era'. The forum was attended by Russian president Dmitry Medvedev and five foreign government leaders: Prime Minister of Spain José Luis Rodríguez Zapatero, General Secretary of the Chinese Communist Party Hu Jintao, President of Kazakhstan Nursultan Nazarbayev, President of Finland Tarja Halonen, and President of Sri Lanka Mahinda Rajapaksa. The discussions at the forum were built around three interrelated pillars: 'Securing Global Growth', 'Building Russia's Creative Capital' and 'Expanding Technology Horizons'. At the opening plenary the participants of the forum were addressed by President of the Russian Federation Dmitry Medvedev and General Secretary of the Chinese Communist Party Hu Jintao. The programme of the forum included the traditional gathering of CEOs of global energy companies at the energy session entitled 'New Paths to Energy Security'. The forum continued cooperation with international television companies. SPIEF 2011 hosted three television debates organised jointly with CNBC, BBC and Bloomberg. The forum continued a series of briefings under the theme 'Doing Business in Russia', which gave participants a chance to acquire firsthand information on legislative initiatives aimed at improving opportunities to do business in Russia as well as pose questions to the key newsmakers who shape the business and investment climate in the country. The closing plenary session 'Managing Fault Lines and Avoiding Future Crises' featured President of the Russian Federation Dmitry Medvedev, President of Kazakhstan Nursultan Nazarbayev, Prime Minister of Spain José Luis Rodríguez Zapatero and President of Finland Tarja Halonen. Dmitry Medvedev awarded the Russian electrophysicist and academic of the Russian Academy of Sciences, Filipp Rutberg, and the American physicist and professor, Arthur Rosenfeld with the Global Energy Prize 2011.

=== 2012 ===
XVI St. Petersburg International Economic Forum

The XVI St. Petersburg International Economic Forum brought together three presidents, two prime ministers and dozens of senior officials and executives from major international companies in Russia's northern capital from June 21–23, 2012, under the slogan "Effective Leadership."

The forum was attended by Russian president Vladimir Putin, and four leaders from other nations: Finnish president Sauli Niinistö, Kyrgyz Republic president Almazbek Atambayev, Macedonian prime minister Nikola Gruevski and Kenyan prime minister Raila Amolo Odinga.

A total of 84 agreements were signed as part of SPIEF 2012 with 9 contracts having a combined value of more than 360 billion rubles, including 4 loan agreements for 164.4 billion rubles.

The fruitful work of SPIEF 2012 can specifically be attributed to the large number of participants – 5,347.

=== 2013 ===
XVII St. Petersburg International Economic Forum

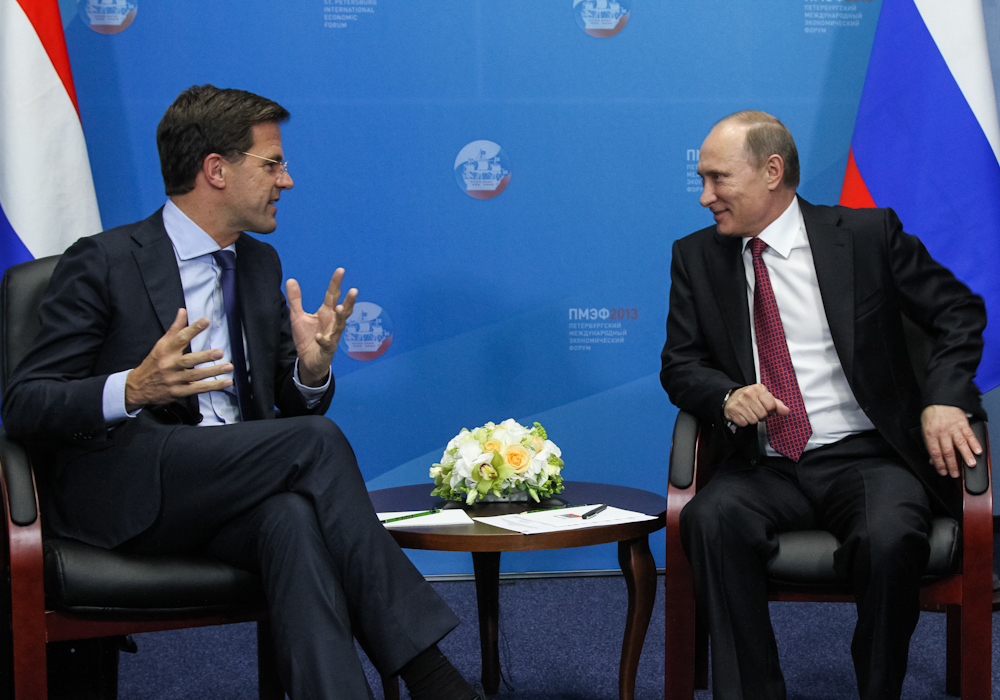
Vladimir Putin with Mark Rutte, 20 June 2013

The XVII St. Petersburg International Economic Forum was held from June 20 to 22, 2013 – this year's theme was "Finding Resolve to Build the New Global Economy". 2013 was a record SPIEF year for the number of attendees – 7190 people attended, from 87 countries, out of which total there were 1245 media representatives. Another record statistic concerning SPIEF 2013 was the number of agreements signed – 102 deals amounting to a financial value of 9.6 trillion rubles (US$291 billion), which is approximately 30 times more than equivalent figure from last year's forum.

The proceedings of the forum were attended by the federal chancellor of Germany, Mrs Angela Merkel, and the prime minister of the Netherlands, Mr Mark Rutte. Since Russia holds the rotating presidency of the G20 this year, a special Business 20 (B20) summit was held on June 20 at SPIEF 2013. The participants in this B20 summit brought concrete proposals to St. Petersburg with them – aimed at stimulating the global economy, creating jobs, and improving the world's monetary and financial system. From June 18 to 20 SPIEF hosted a Y20 youth summit, and on June 22, 2013 there was a Russia–ASEAN Business Forum.

=== 2014 ===
XVIII St. Petersburg International Economic Forum

The XVIII St. Petersburg International Economic Forum was held from May 22 to 24, 2014. Theme of SPIEF 2014: "Sustaining Confidence in a World Undergoing Transformation". The forum included 82 events, and welcomed three foreign heads of state. In total, the forum was attended by over 7,500 participants, including 248 heads of major international companies and 445 heads of Russian companies, 40 international and 24 Russian executives listed in the Forbes and Fortune rankings, 219 international delegates from 73 countries. The forum was covered by 1,439 media representatives from 24 countries

=== 2015 ===
XIX St. Petersburg International Economic Forum

The XIX St. Petersburg International Economic Forum was held from June 18 to 20, 2015. Theme of SPIEF 2015: "Time to Act: Shared Paths to Stability and Growth". SPIEF included over 150 events, including SCO and the BRICS forums. The forum programme alone offered 84 events: summits, panel discussions, roundtables, briefings, and televised debates. Those present included Prime Minister of Greece Alexis Tsipras, General Secretary of the Chinese Communist Party Xi Jinping, and heads of state of Kyrgyzstan, Myanmar, Mongolia, Saudi Arabia, Bahrain, and Iraq.

In total, the forum was attended by over 10,000 participants from 120 countries, including Russia; 486 heads of major Russian companies and 319 heads of international companies. 2,061 media representatives.

=== 2016 ===
XX St. Petersburg International Economic Forum

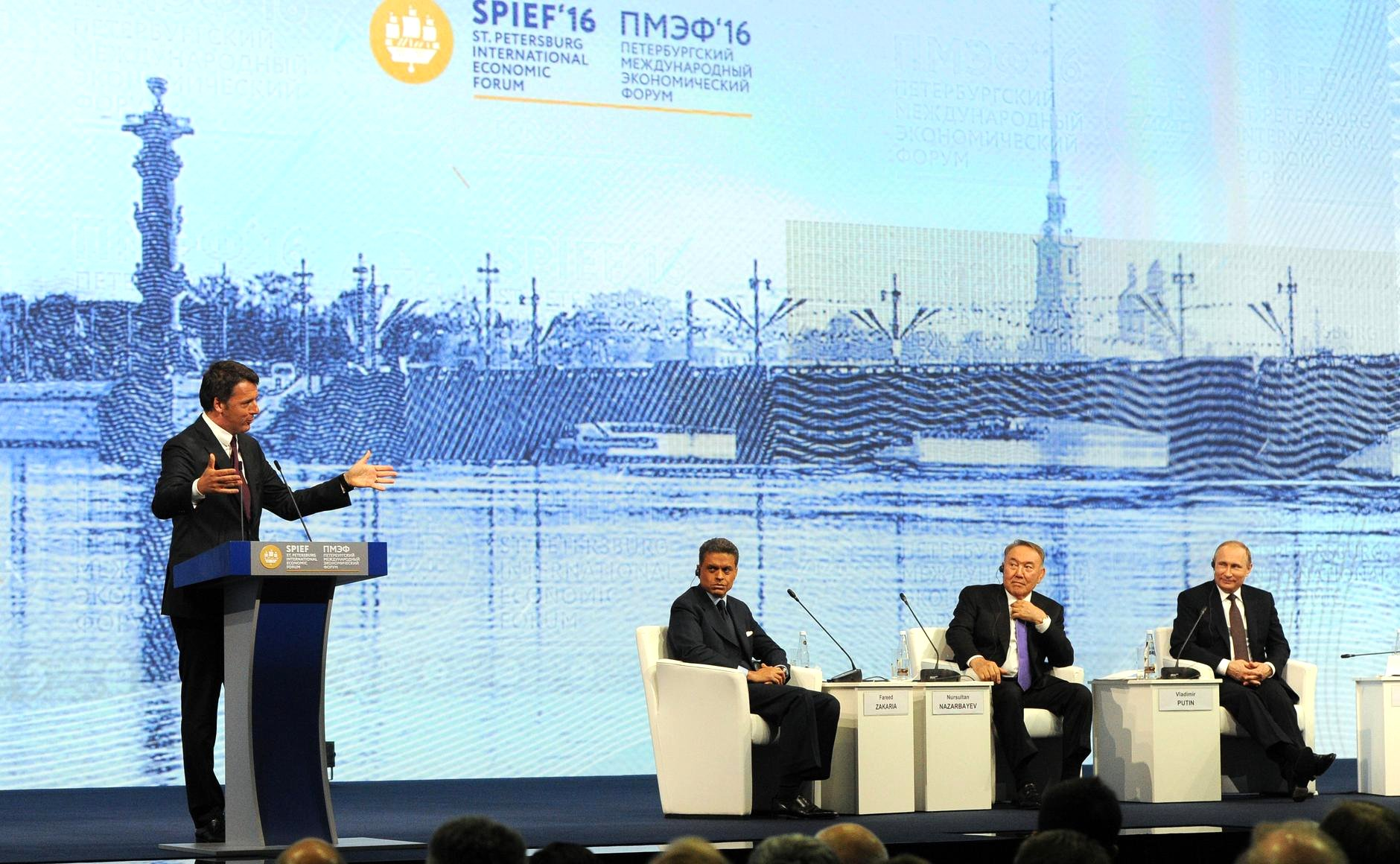
Matteo Renzi, CNN's Fareed Zakaria, Nursultan Nazarbayev and Vladimir Putin, 17 June 2016

The XX St. Petersburg International Economic Forum was held on June 16–18, 2016. The forum was attended by more than 12,000 participants from 133 countries; more than 600 heads of Russian companies and approximately 300 foreign executives; and 2,651 media representatives from 700 organizations. The theme for SPIEF 2016 was 'Capitalizing on the New Global Economic Reality'. More than 300 events were held on the margins of the forum, including SCO, BRICS, and B20 forums, and a meeting with prominent academics and Nobel Prize winners. Italian prime minister Matteo Renzi, President of Kazakhstan Nursultan Nazarbayev, President of Guinea Alpha Condé, UN secretary-general Ban Ki-moon, and President of the European Commission Jean-Claude Juncker all took part in the forum alongside other high-ranking personalities.

The twentieth anniversary Forum was held at a new venue – the ExpoForum Convention and Exhibition Centre.

=== 2017 ===
XXI St. Petersburg International Economic Forum

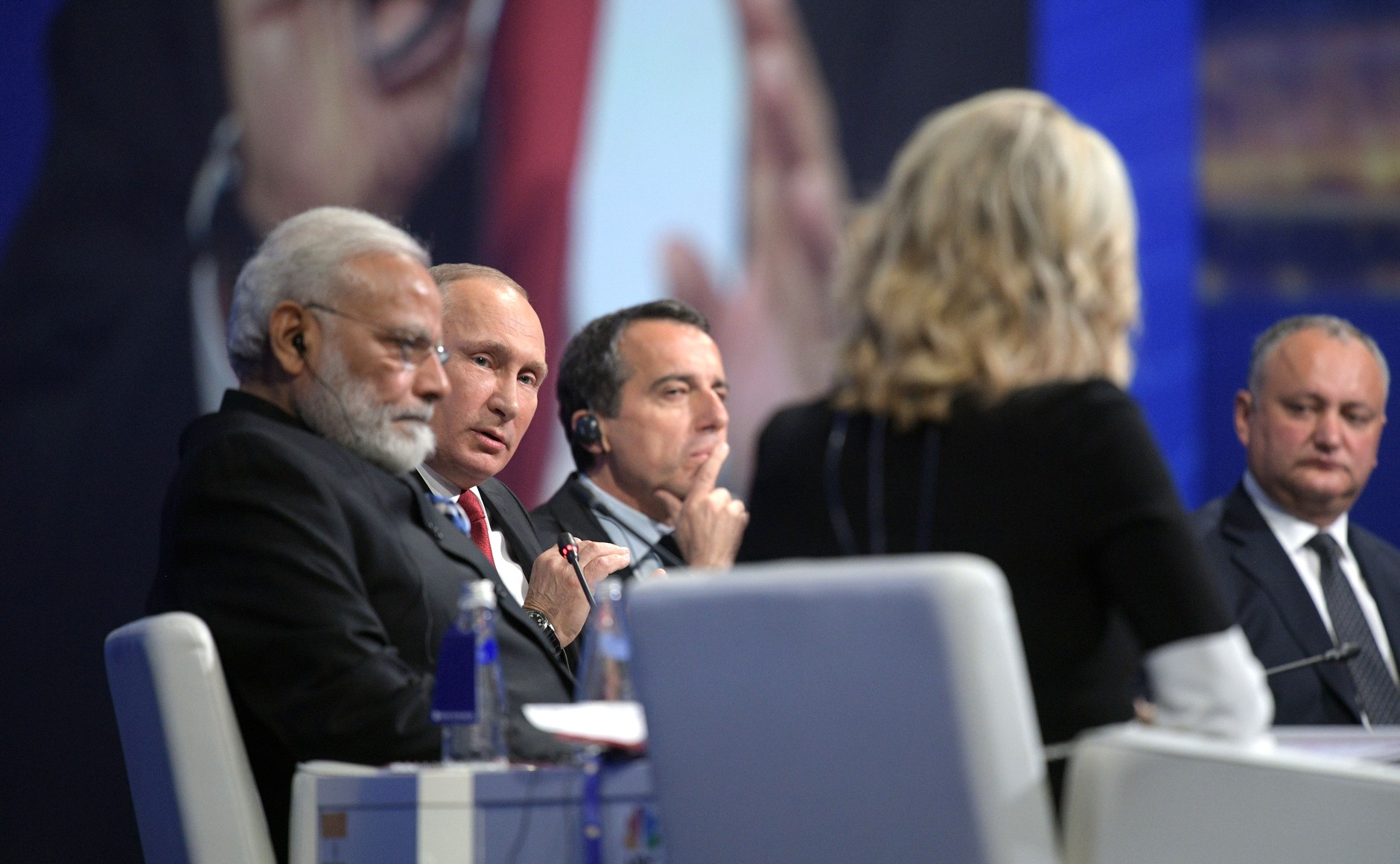
Narendra Modi and Vladimir Putin at the St. Petersburg International Economic Forum in 2017.

The XXI St. Petersburg International Economic Forum was held on June 1–3, 2017. Indian prime minister Narendra Modi attended the forum as the Guest of Honour, and also addressed the forum. This was the first time that an Indian prime minister had attended the forum. Also attending were the president of Moldova Igor Dodon, and the Chancellor of Austria, Christian Kern.

=== 2018 ===
XXII St. Petersburg International Economic Forum

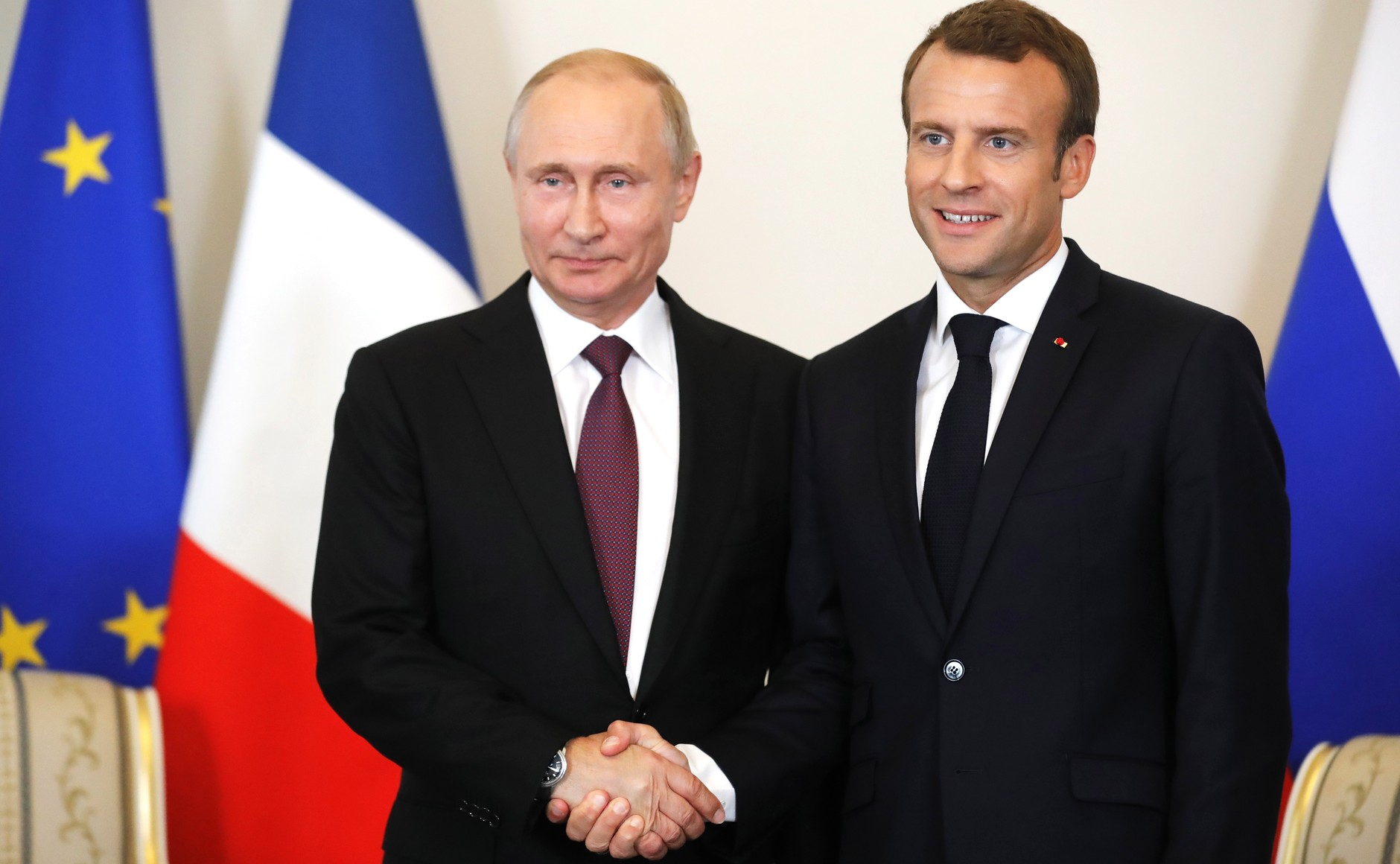
Vladimir Putin and Emmanuel Macron.

The XXII St. Petersburg International Economic Forum was held on May 25–26, 2018. Attending was the president of France Emmanuel Macron, Chinese vice president Wang Qishan, and the prime minister of Japan Shinzo Abe.

=== 2019 ===
XXIII St. Petersburg International Economic Forum

The XXII St. Petersburg International Economic Forum was held on June 6–8, 2019. Attending guests included General Secretary of the Chinese Communist Party Xi Jinping, Prime Minister of India Narendra Modi, President of Bulgaria Rumen Radev, Prime Minister of Slovakia Peter Pellegrini, Prime Minister of Armenia Nikol Pashinyan and UN Secretary General António Guterres.

=== 2021 ===
XXIV St. Petersburg International Economic Forum

The XXIV St. Petersburg International Economic Forum was held on June 2–5, 2021. The forum was attended by participants from 141 countries, including representatives of more than 1,000 media organizations from 46 countries.

=== 2022 ===
XXV St. Petersburg International Economic Forum

The XXV St. Petersburg International Economic Forum - on June 15–18, 2022. The theme of SPIEF 2022 is, "New world - new opportunities". Representatives of 115 countries participated. Attending guests included Cuban Prime Minister Manuel Marrero Cruz, Egyptian president Abdel Fattah el-Sisi, Belarusian president Aleksandr Lukashenko, Armenian president Vahagn Khachaturyan, President of Kazakhstan Kassym-Jomart Tokayev, Venezuelan vice president Delcy Rodríguez, Central African Republic prime minister Félix Moloua, among others. Delegations from the Taliban-ruled Afghanistan and Donetsk People's Republic were also present at the 2022 forum.

The 25th forum participation level decreased and secrecy increased due to Western boycotts owing to the Russian invasion of Ukraine. Despite the announced ban, the president of the American Chamber of Commerce in Russia did participate in the forum; this time though, there were much less American-born investors who took part in the forum. It was noted that the forum was hard to attend due to sanctions imposed on Russian airlines. Participants who did not wish to be disclosed were allowed to hide their affiliation on official badges and remove public information.

=== 2023 ===
XXVI St. Petersburg International Economic Forum

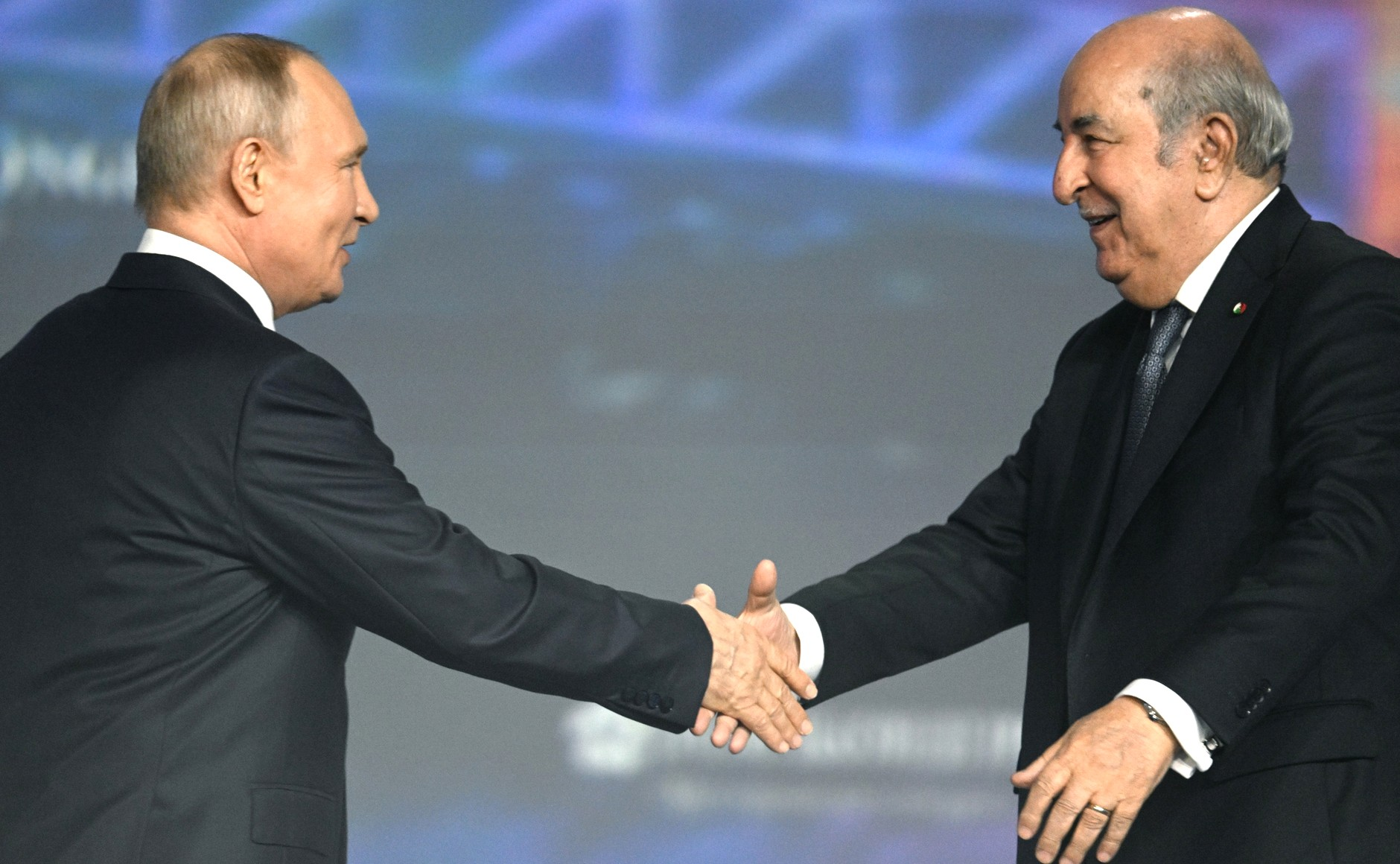
Putin and Algerian president Abdelmadjid Tebboune, 16 June 2023

The 26th St. Petersburg International Economic Forum (SPIEF) was held on June 14–17, 2023, with 17,000 people from 130 countries present. Due to the Russian invasion of Ukraine, the attendance was reduced, and many invitees declined to attend in solidarity with Ukraine. However, organizers claimed that 150 companies from 25 "unfriendly countries" also participated in the event, including an American business delegation that was not included in the official list of attendees.

Despite the reduced size of the event because of ongoing international sanctions against Russia, nations friendly towards Russia had profited from the meeting, but some EU countries also signed new joint ventures. About 900 agreements were signed worth almost 4 trillion rubles (USD 47 billion), mostly in the energy and mining sectors, according to government sources, including a joint project between Russia's Rosseti power grid company and Vietnam's National Power Transmission Corporation (EVNNPT).

During the plenary, President Vladimir Putin told a forum that Russia had already stationed a first batch of tactical nuclear weapons in Belarus but that they would only be used if Russia's territory or state was threatened.

=== 2024 ===
XXVII St. Petersburg International Economic Forum

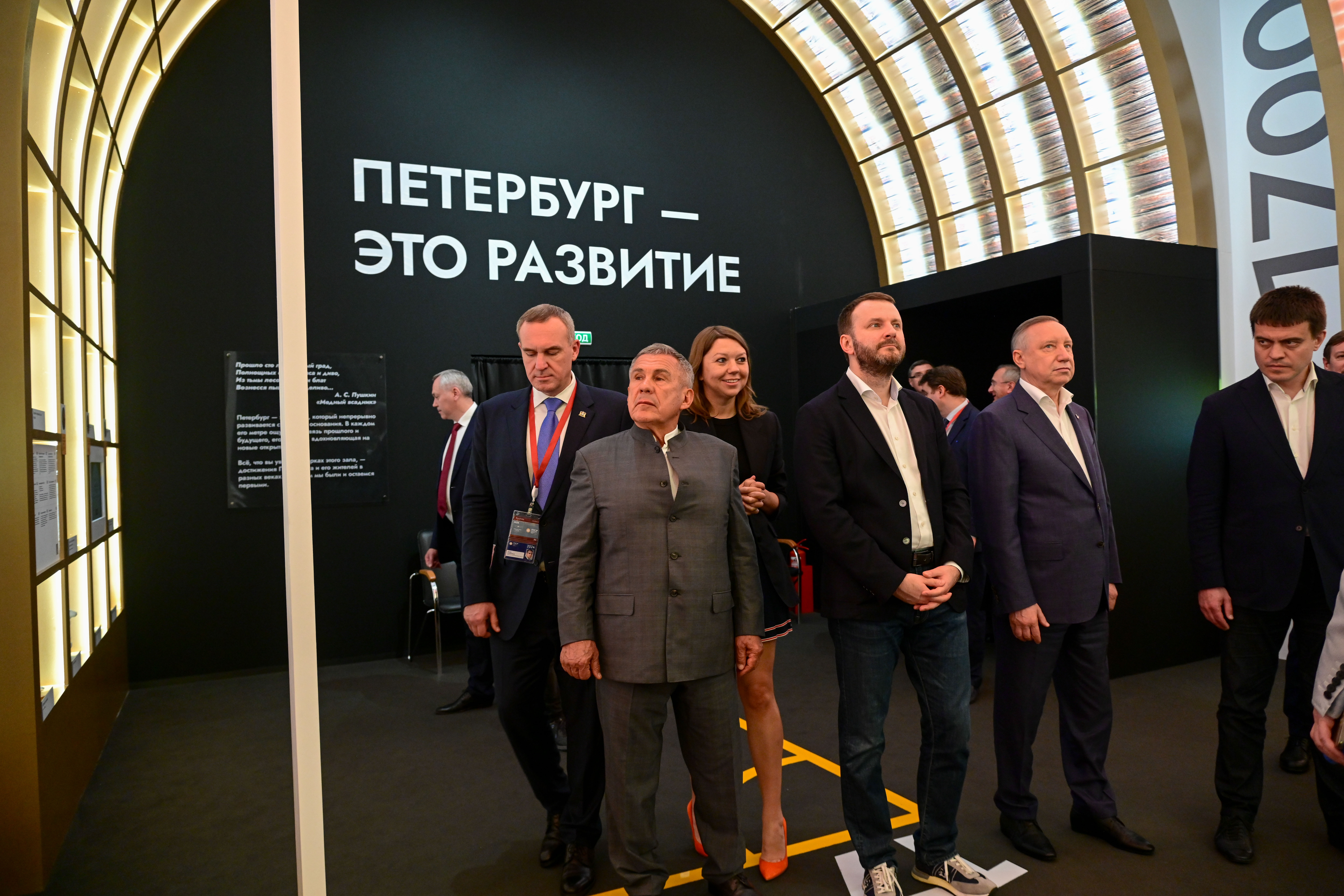
Head of Tatarstan Rustam Minnikhanov

The 27th St. Petersburg International Economic Forum under Roscongress auspices was held between June 5–8, 2024. This SPIEF resulted in 982 agreements being signed for a total of 6.43 trillion rubles (USD 71.87 billion). Also, SPIEF 2024 attended by 21,300 participants from 139 countries took part in the events of the St. Petersburg International Economic Forum. This year Oman and Bolivia was choose as main guest venue of SPIEF 2024. Notable leaders who attended were President Luis Arce of Bolivia, President Emmerson Mnangagwa of Zimbabwe, Yevgenia Gutsul as Governor of Autonomous Gagauzia (part of Moldova), and Milorad Dodik as President of Republic Srpska (part of Bosnia and Herzegovina). Also, there were Taliban representatives, Laureano Ortega (special adviser to the Nicaragua president), Felix Moloua (Prime Minister of the Central African Republic) and Karin Kneissel (ex-Minister Foreign Affairs of Austria), while other notable ministers who attended this forum included Peter Szijjarto (Minister of Foreign Affairs of Hungary).

Russian political scientist Sergey Karaganov was a host for the 27th St. Petersburg International Economic Forum where he shared the stage with Vladimir Putin.

In the year of the Russian BRICS presidency, the focus was on the development of a multipolar, multimodal, polycentric world. Dilma Rousseff, the president of the BRICS New Development Bank, met with Sergey Glazyev, the Minister of Macroeconomics of the Eurasian Economic Union (EAEU). President Putin stated, after a meeting with Rousseff, that the BRICS were working on their own payment infrastructure.

=== 2025 ===
XXVIII St. Petersburg International Economic Forum

The 28th St. Petersburg International Economic Forum was held between June 18-21, 2025. The forum was themed "Shared Values as a Foundation for Growth in a Multipolar World." Major topics included the expansions of the BRICS, alternative energy strategies, improved Arctic connectivity and Global South partnerships. The forum also maintained selective engagement with Western stakeholders including the American Chamber of Commerce in Russia, reflecting Moscow's interest in preserving limited dialogue channels with the West. Though there were no foreign companies among the exibitors, EM, financial communications firm, management partner Denis Denisov said that the gathering had become an opportunity for firms to develop government relations. On 19 June, Indonesian president Prabowo Subianto, the only head of state arrived, attended the 2025 SPIEF as a guest of honour. He met Russian president Putin, and the two heads of state signed a strategic partnership agreement. Indonesian and Russian sovereign funds Danantara and the Russian Direct Investment Fund signed an agreement to create an investment fund worth 2 billion Euros (US$2.9 billion).

=== 2026 ===
In 2026, for the fifth time after Russia scaled up the Russian invasion of Ukraine 2022, the forum was arranged from 3rd to 6th of June. Early in the morning of the opening day, military and economic targets in St Petersburg were attacked by Ukrainian drones. The guided missile corvette Boikiy caught fire and thick smoke emerged from the oil terminal.

== Organizational features ==
=== The organizing committee ===
The organizing committee of the forum was formed in 2008 in accordance with the decree of the president of the Russian Federation. Its participants were confirmed by the Ministry of Economic Development and Trade. Later changes to the organizing committee were made as a result of the changing roles of the participants.

The organizing committee traditionally consists of representatives of the various ministries, agencies and organizations involved in the organization of SPIEF (for example, the Ministry of Foreign Affairs for visa support, the FSO for security provision etc.) or those that have participated in the foundation and development of the forum, as well as the directors of SPIEF.

Committee meetings are not held to a regular schedule; they happen 2–3 times during the preparation period of a particular Forum. The organizing committee approves key decisions that will later be executed by the agencies and the SPIEF Foundation.

Initially, the chairperson of the organizing committee was the minister of economic development (according to position); however, the president of the Russian Federation signed two decrees regarding the organizing committee in November 2014. From this point onwards the chairperson of the organizing committee is appointed by the president of the Russian Federation, and first to be appointed was the vice president – Sergey Prikhodko, the government chief of staff.

=== The SPIEF Foundation becomes the Roscongress Foundation ===
The St. Petersburg International Economic Forum Foundation (abbreviated to SPIEF) was founded in March 2007 for the purpose of organizing and running the forum. There is no publicly available information regarding the link between the SPIEF Foundation and the St. Petersburg Economic Forum International Foundation, which was founded in 1998. The official objectives of the Foundation are:

- to organize SPIEF and other economic forums, roundtables, conferences, seminars, business meetings, presentations, and expos;
- to enhance the effectiveness of Russia's economic policies;
- to improve Russia's global image;
- foster an environment conducive to cooperation between Russian and international leaders in the business and political communities.

Anton Troyanov was the first person to serve as Director of the SPIEF Foundation. In April 2009, he was replaced by Alexander Stuglev, who had previously served as Deputy Director in charge of delegate relations.

Prior to 2011, SPIEF Foundation headquarters were located in Pavilion 9 of the Lenexpo Exhibition Complex, inside the Marine Fleet Research and Development Institute building. In 2011, Pavilion 9 closed all but a handful of services located on the first floor, while the Foundation's core team moved to a new home at the Baltis Plaza Business Centre, located on Vasilievsky Island not far from Lenexpo. During the forum, Pavilion 9 serves as the SPIEF operations centre.

The Foundation is structured to include all the offices needed to organize events: accreditation, technical support, financial, legal, short-term employment, etc. As a result, the Foundation has branched out to organize other events not related to the St. Petersburg International Economic Forum.

In 2011, the SPIEF Foundation was named sole state contractor for a wide range of services related to organizing and conducting events around Russia's Asia-Pacific Economic Cooperation chairmanship, with the exception of the summit held as part of the forum.

On December 4, 2015, the St. Petersburg International Economic Forum Foundation was renamed the Roscongress Foundation.

=== Forum venue ===
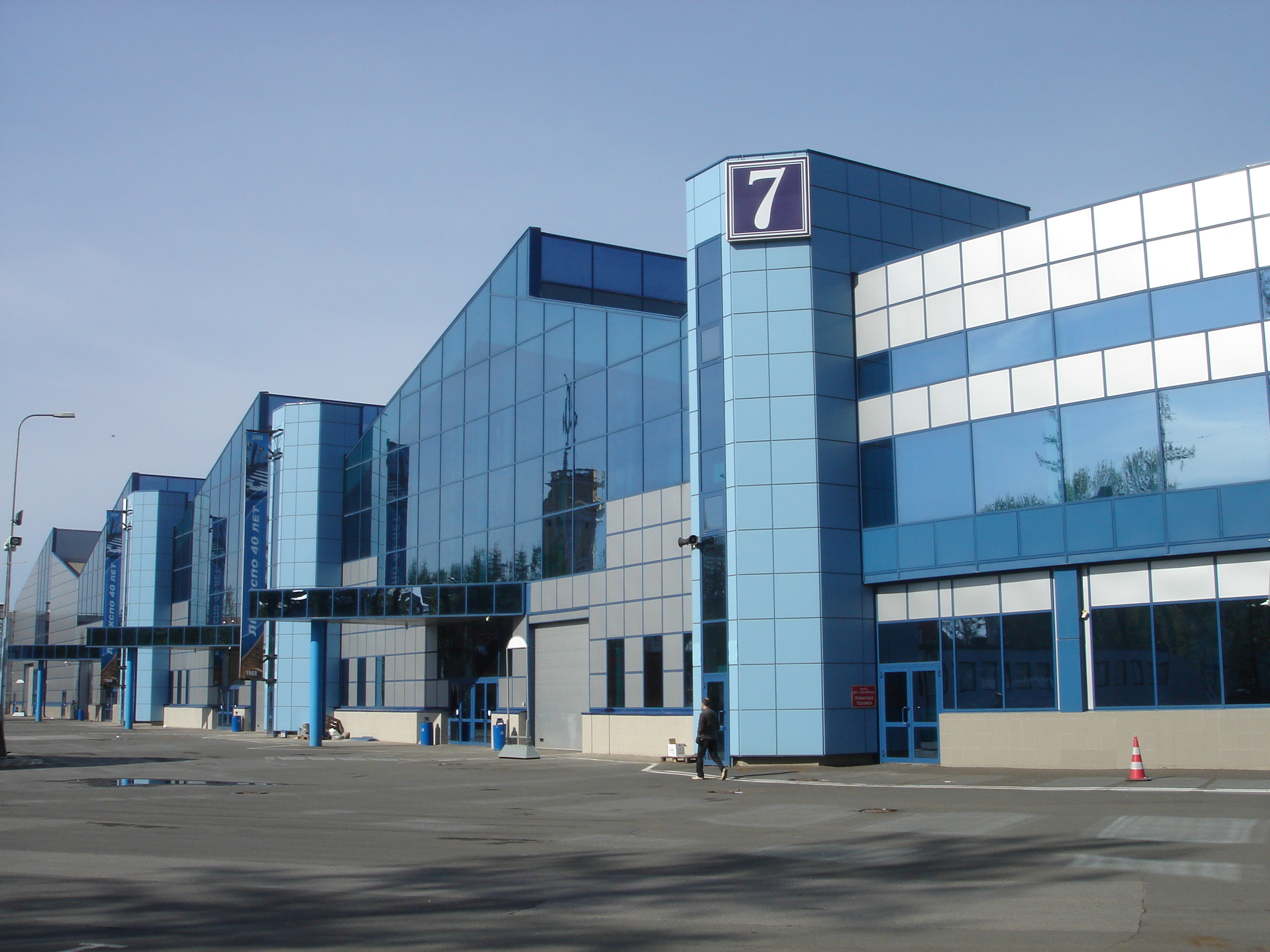
Lenexpo Pavilion 7

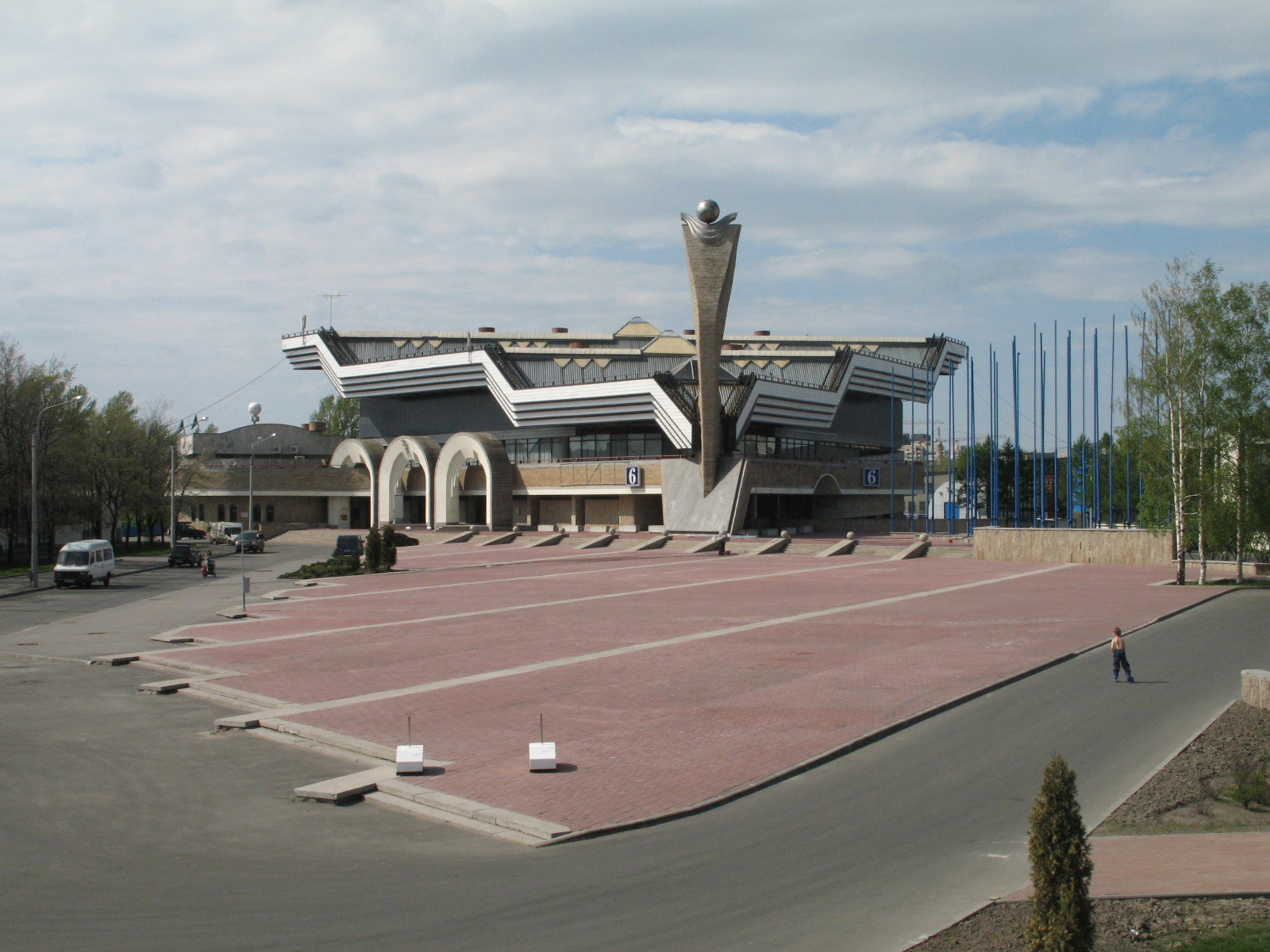
Lenexpo Pavilion 6 - press-center

Since 2006, the forum has been held at the Lenexpo Exhibition Complex, located on Vasilievsky Island in St. Petersburg (latitude 9°55′50″ north, longitude 30°14′00″ east). In 2007, a few months before the 11th SPIEF, Lenexpo unveiled the new Pavilion 8A, which would go on to host the forum's plenary sessions.

Most of the forum's indoor and outdoor facilities are temporary structures which are dismantled once the event is over.

SPIEF facilities at Lenexpo, since 2007:

- Pavilion 3: outdoor café and event hall;
- Pavilion 4: accreditation zone on the ground floor; café and three halls for hosting events on the first floor;
- Pavilion 5: dining area and halls for hosting events;
- Pavilion 6: press centre;
- Pavilion 7: exhibition space for forum sponsors and partners;
- Pavilion 8: halls for hosting events;
- Pavilion 8A: plenary session hall for up to 2,800 people.

Temporary partner pavilions located in the open-air sections of Lenexpo host various events, including presentations and cultural events.

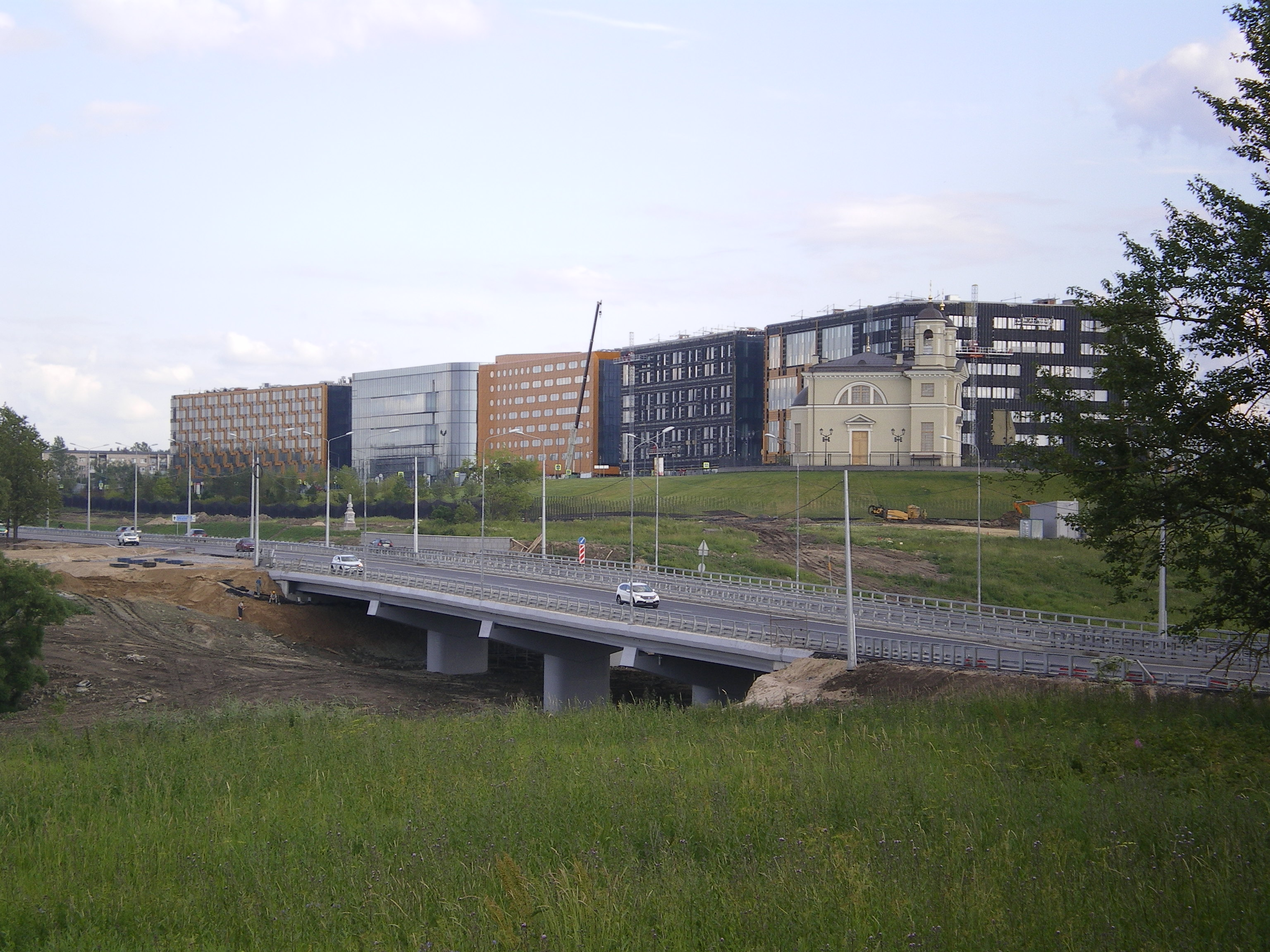
New Expoforum complex is being built near the Pulkovo Airport

In 2016 SPIEF will take place at a new venue – the ExpoForum Convention and Exhibition Centre, located in Pulkovo Heights.

=== Transport for participants ===
Each year since 2007, the forum's partners have included a major global car manufacturer, which donates over 200 new executive-class cars for SPIEF participants. As a rule, these cars bear the forum logo. Once the forum is over, distributors sell these cars at a discount.

Official SPIEF cars:

- 2007 (11th SPIEF) – Audi
- 2008 (12th SPIEF) – BMW
- 2009-2021 – Mercedes-Benz, which provided 300 cars in 2012 and 350 cars in 2013, 2014, and 2015. In 2015, 100 of the 350 cars provided by the company were the Mercedes-Maybach model, which went on sale in March of that year.
- 2023 (26th SPIEF) – Exeed VX and Russian Railways as official transport partner and the official car of the forum.
- 2024-2026 – Hongqi (marque)

=== Cultural programme ===
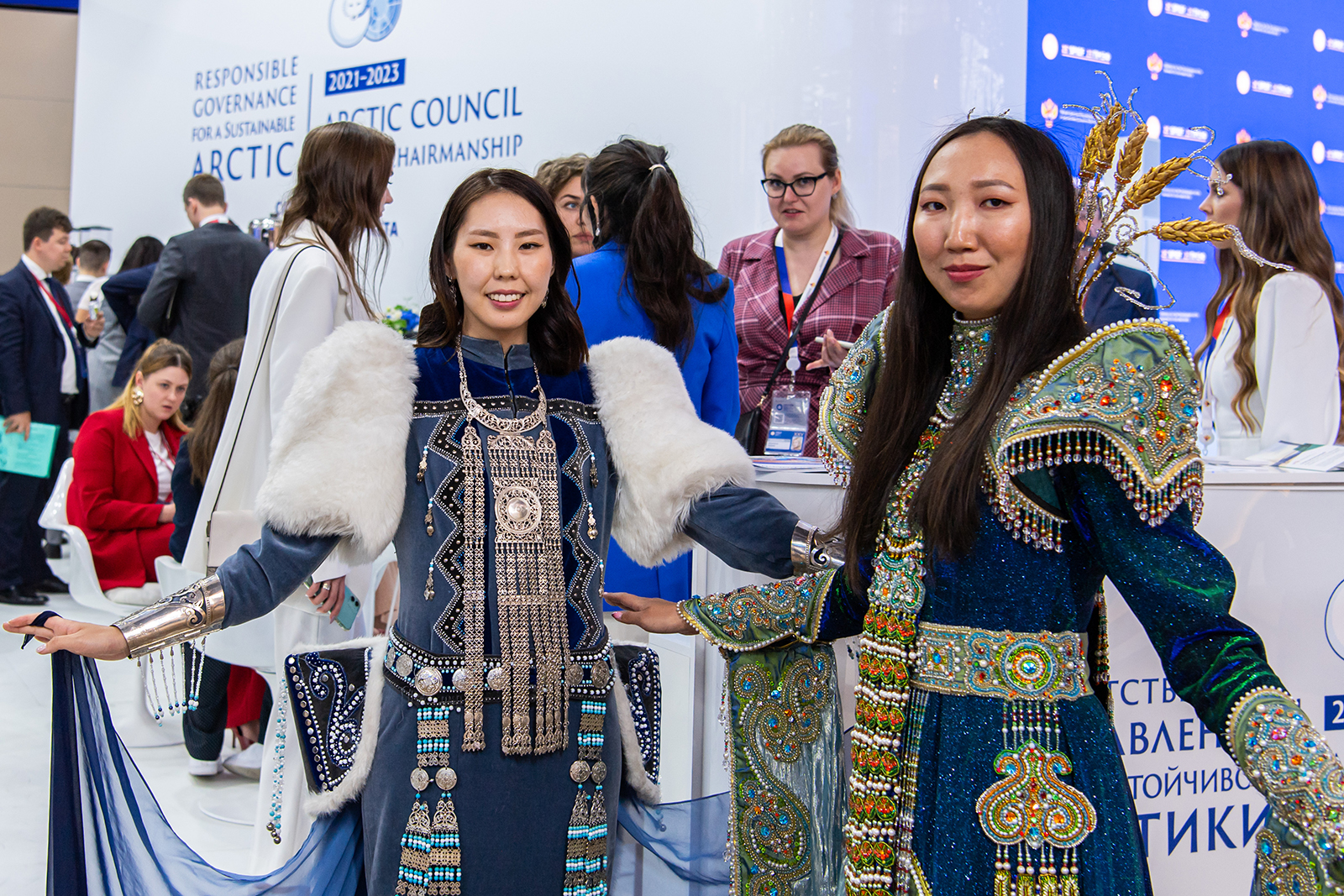
Siberian natives in folk costumes on 17 June 2022

In 2007, the organizers began to pay closer attention to the non-business part of the programme: cultural events taking place under the auspices of the forum. Some sources have suggested the cultural programme was initially developed for people accompanying forum participants (primarily spouses) who did not attend roundtables. Eventually, however, cultural events were incorporated into the main SPIEF programme.

The majority of events on the SPIEF cultural programme are open only to Forum participants. Since the programme varies each year, many events are offered only once, with the notable exception of traditional private official receptions hosted by the governor and the organizing committee.

At the same time, in 2007 the forum launched what would become traditional annual open-air concerts on Palace Square in St. Petersburg, performed by some of the world's most famous artists and designed to highlight SPIEF's social significance.

Concerts held on Palace Square as part of SPIEF:

- 2007 – Scorpions and Robin Gibb of the Bee Gees, accompanied by the Mariinsky Theatre Symphony Orchestra and Choir, conducted by Valery Gergiev.
- 2008 – concert by founding member of Pink Floyd Roger Waters (tickets for the event cost as much as RUB 15,000).
- 2009 – concert by celebrated British band Duran Duran and American pop singer Anastacia.
- 2010 – British electronic band Faithless with a presentation of their album, The Dance.
- 2011 – concert by British rock musician and actor Sting.
- 2012 – Dmitri Hvorostovsky, Sumi Jo, and 12-year-old Jackie Evancho share the stage for "A Bouquet of Opera".
- 2013 – Celebrating the Classics: the quartet Il Divo and the Italian band Le Div4s perform with the St. Petersburg State Symphony Orchestra.

In 2014, Palace Square did not host a concert dedicated to the forum. Instead, the Ice Palace hosted a SPIEF benefit showcase of international figure skating stars and medallists of the Sochi Winter Olympics. In 2015, the forum also did not include a free concert for city residents.

== See also ==
- Arctic Economic Council
- International Economic Forum of the Americas
- World Economic Forum
