= Anton Kobyakov =

Russian presidential advisor

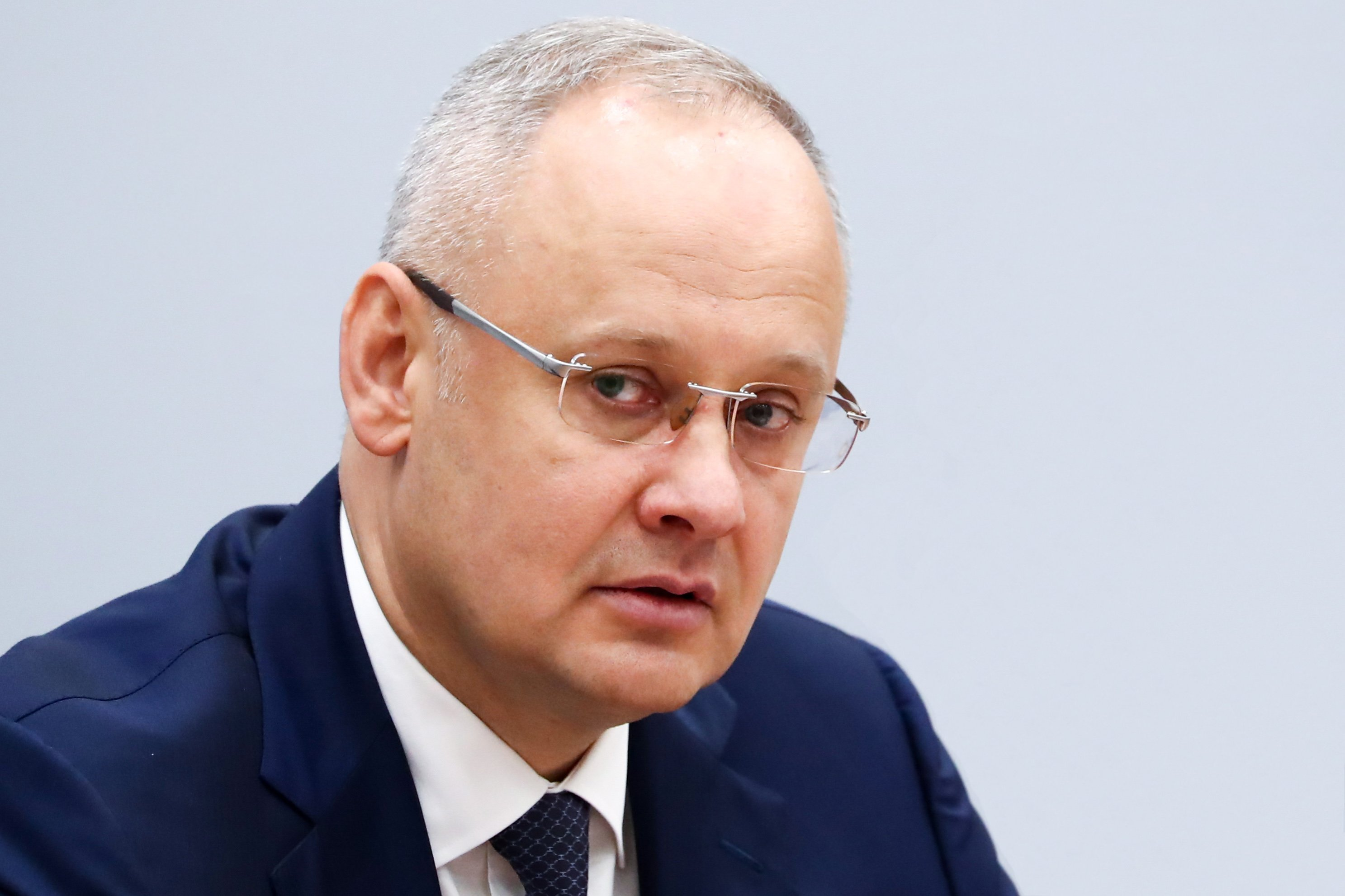
Kobyakov in 2019

Anton Kobyakov (born 23 June 1968) is one of Vladimir Putin's Special Advisors. He works in the Presidential Administration of Russia.

== Biography ==
Kobyakov was born in Ufa on 23 June 1968.

Kobyakov began his career as a Bashkortostan geology worker.

In 1990 Kobyakov graduated from Timiryazev Agricultural Academy.

In 2001 Kobyakov graduated from Moscow State Mining University.

In 2003 Kobyakov graduated from the Presidential Russian Civil Service Academy (RANEPA).

Between 2012 and 2014 Kobyakov was Head of the Presidential Secretariat.

On 11 April 2014 Kobyakov began a job as Special Advisor to the President.

On 23 April 2019 Kobyakov met with the Secretary-General of the Shanghai Cooperation Organization, Vladimir Norov.

In September 2022 Kobyakov was the Executive Secretary of Eastern Economic Forum Organizing Committee.

In June 2024 Kobyakov was the President of the Roscongress Foundation.

On 23 October 2024 Kobyakov presented a briefing at the 16th BRICS Conference.

In November 2024 Kobyakov helped a Chinese diplomat to meet a number of African delegations at the Roscongress Russia-Africa conference in Sochi.

On 17 February 2025 Kobyakov was at a meeting of the Roscongress Foundation with Yevgeny Primakov Jr., Head of the Russian Federal Agency for the Commonwealth of Independent States. The purpose of the meeting was to allow Roscongress join forces with Rossotrudnichestvo for organizational support for its events and initiatives abroad.

On 19 May 2025 Kobyakov opened the 13th edition of the St. Petersburg International Legal Forum with more than 5,600 participants from 80 countries. The Legal Forum is an activity presented by the Roscongress Foundation. At the closing press conference, Kobyakov claimed that the dissolution of the USSR was "legally invalid" and that it therefore still exists. According to Kobyakov, the war in Ukraine is an internal issue rather than an international war.
