= International Financial Congress =

Defunct central bankers forum

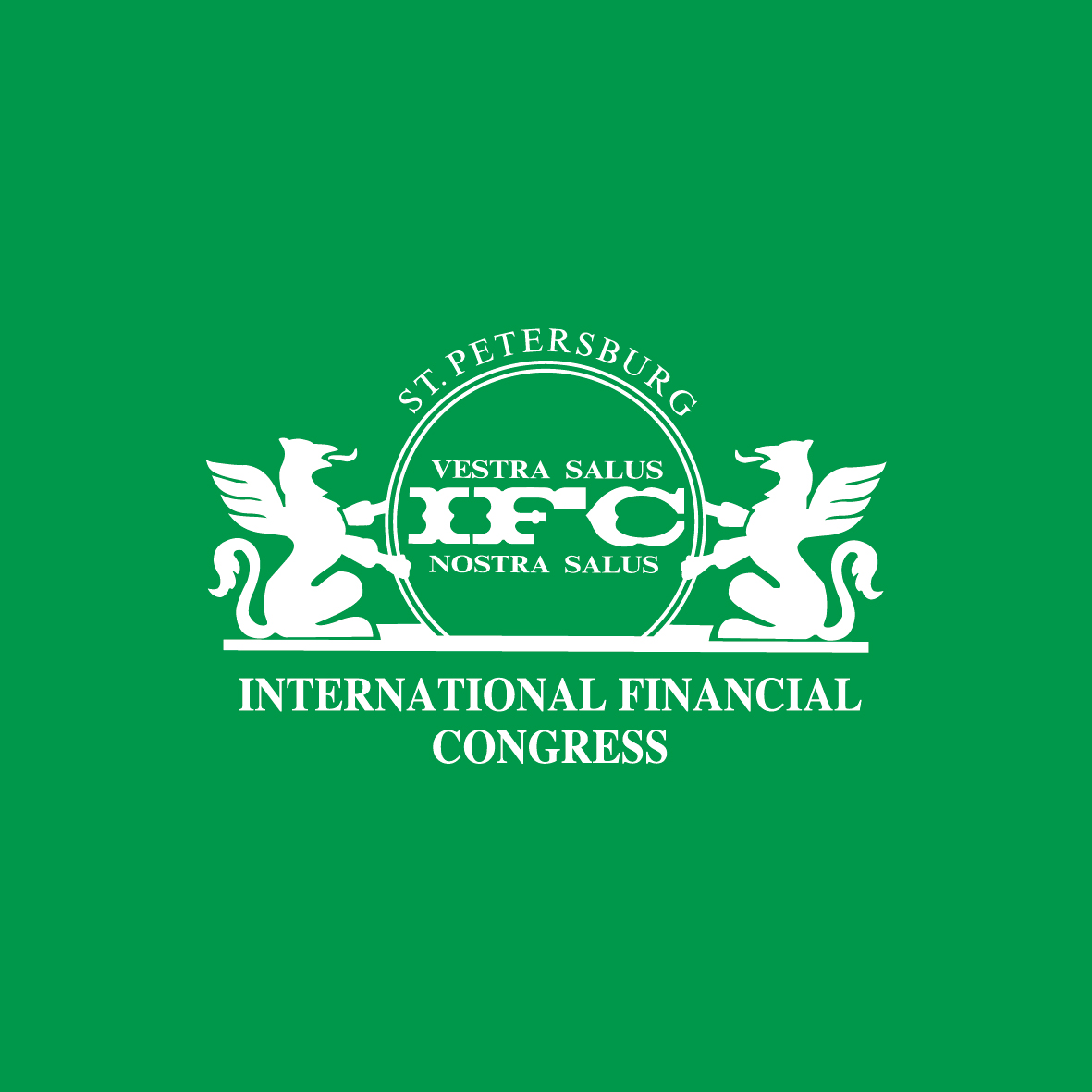
- Status: Defunct
- Genre: Finance
- Venue: Expoforum
- Location: Saint Petersburg
- Country: Russia
- Years active: 1991 - 2019 (converted to the Financial Congress of the Bank of Russia)
- Organizer: The Central Bank of the Russian Federation, Roscongress Foundation
- Website: ibcongress.com

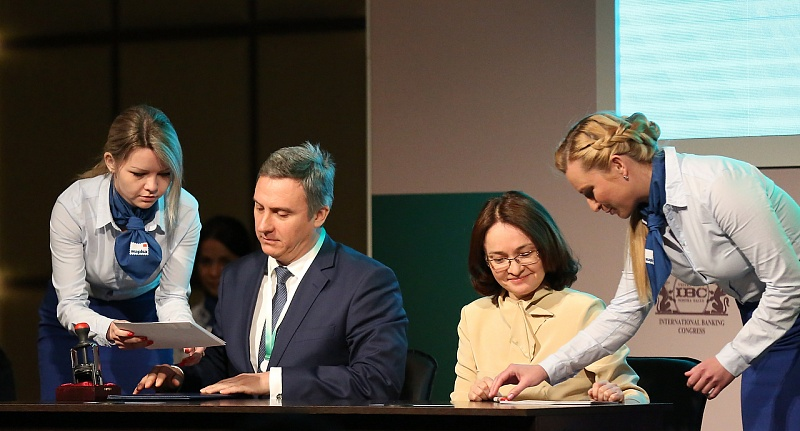
The ceremony of memorable cancellation of the post block with stamps devoted to the Bank of Russia history

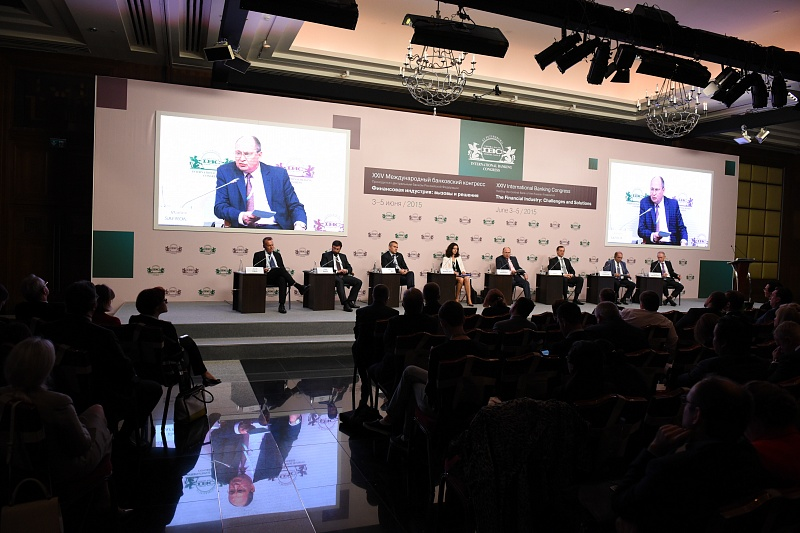
Roundtable on bank regulation and supervision

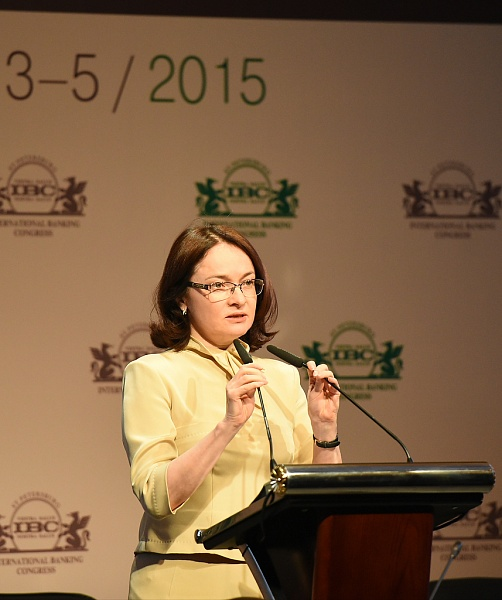
Special Address by Elvira Nabiullina, Governor, Bank of Russia in 2015

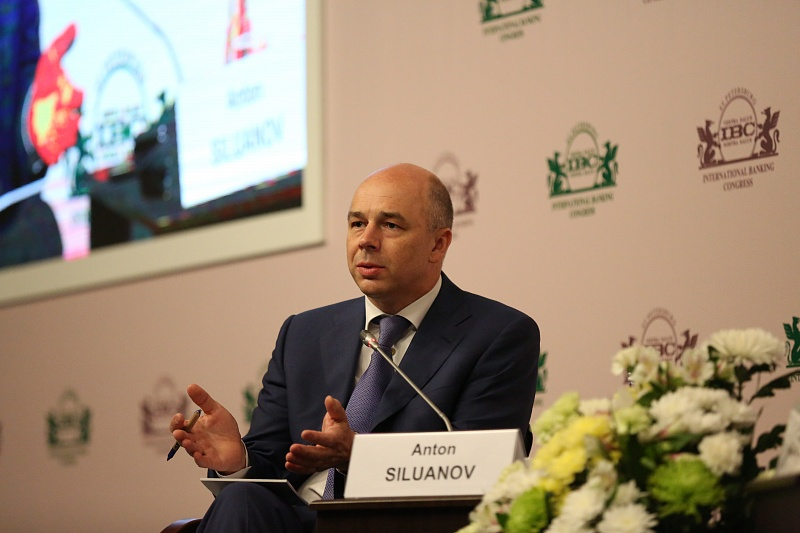
Dialogue with Anton Siluanov, Minister of Finance of the Russian Federation in 2015

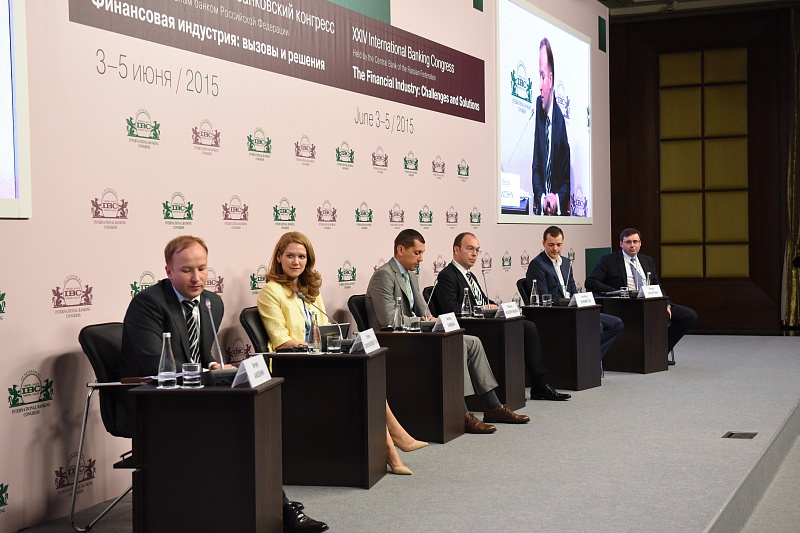
Roundtable on reform of OTC derivatives market in 2015

The International Financial Congress (IFC) was an annual conference hosted in Saint Petersburg in Russia dedicated to the finance industry. The event brought together heads of central and commercial banks, financial institutions, international financial organizations and financial regulatory authorities, as well as renowned experts from around the world and figures from academia and business. It ran from 1991 until 2019.

Since 1992, it had been held in St. Petersburg and was called the International Banking Congress (IBC) until 2016 when it was renamed as the International Financial Congress. Congress sessions were held in the form of interactive discussions, in which the most topical issues arising in the global banking and financial system are discussed.

The conference was cancelled in 2020 due to Covid-19 and held online in 2021. After the Russian invasion of Ukraine in 2022, international participants could no longer attend and the conference was renamed the Financial Congress of the Bank of Russia with a focus on domestic Russian economy and banking.

== History ==
In the autumn of 1991, the first International Banking Congress was held in Frankfurt am Main, which was attended by Anatoly Sobchak, the then Mayor of St. Petersburg, and Viktor Khalansky, who was in charge of the Main St. Petersburg Office of the Central Bank of Russia. In his speech, Sobchak suggested that the next Congress be held in St. Petersburg.

An initiative was put forward by the Central Bank of Russia, and subsequently approved by the Russian government, to approach the world's leading banking institutions with the proposal to hold the International Banking Congress in St. Petersburg.

The proposal gained support from representatives of leading banks, international banking and financial institutions, and audit firms.

On January 16, 1992, a non-governmental organization, named the Foundation for Support of the International Banking Congress, was established to facilitate the running of the congress. The organization was renamed the St. Petersburg Public Foundation for the Support of the International Banking Congress in 1998.

In April 1992, the first St. Petersburg-based International Banking Congress was held. The Congress was attended by over 350 participants from 50 countries. The Vice-Mayor of St. Petersburg was a member of the organizing committee for the first five International Banking Congress events. The President of the Russian Federation Vladimir Putin became a member of the committee.

The conference was cancelled in 2020 due to COVID-19 pandemic and held online in 2001.

In 2022, after the Russian invasion of Ukraine, the conference was renamed the Financial Congress of the Bank of Russia with a focus on the domestic Russian economy and banking.

== IFC timeline ==
Congress Dates	Congress Name	Congress Theme
April 21–23, 1993	2nd International Banking Congress (IBC-1993)	East–West: Strategy and Tactics of Economic Interaction.
September 14–17, 1994	3rd International Banking Congress (IBC-1994)	Economic Stabilization and Strengthening of National Currencies.
June 6–9, 1995	4th International Banking Congress (IBC-1995)	Banking Personnel: Training, Skill Improvement and Management.
June 4–8, 1996	5th International Banking Congress (IBC-1996)	State and Problems of Development of the Securities Market in Russia.
June 3–7, 1997	6th International Banking Congress (IBC-1997)	Banking Risk Management: Experience and Problems.
June 2–6, 1998	7th International Banking Congress (IBC-1998)	Globalization of Financial Markets: Driving Forces and Consequences.
June 2–5, 1999	8th International Banking Congress (IBC-1999)	Restructuring of the Banking System: Experience, Problems, Prospects.
June 7–10, 2000	9th International Banking Congress (IBC-2000)	Banks: Challenges of the New Century.
June 6–9, 2001	10th International Banking Congress (IBC-2001)	Corporate Governance in Credit Institutions.
June 5–8, 2002	11th International Banking Congress (IBC-2002)	Market Discipline and Transparency: Accounting, Reporting, and Audit.
June 4–7, 2003	12th International Banking Congress (IBC-2003)	The Banking Sector and Sustainable Economic Growth.
June 2–5, 2004	13th International Banking Congress (IBC-2004)	Russia’s Banking System: Reflecting International Trends and Standards.
June 1–4, 2005	14th International Banking Congress (IBC-2005)	Banks. Regulation. Economics.
June 7–10, 2006	15th International Banking Congress (IBC-2006)	Basel Accords: Approaches and Implementation.
June 6–9, 2007	16th International Banking Congress (IBC-2007)	Banks: Capitalization, Sustainability, Competitiveness.
May 28–31, 2008	17th International Banking Congress (IBC-2008)	Banks and Financial Intermediation: Current State and Prospects.
May 27–30, 2009	18th International Banking Congress (IBC-2009)	Growth and Sustainability in the Banking System: Finding the Optimum Balance.
May 26–29, 2010	19th International Banking Congress (IBC-2010)	Banks: Life After Crisis.
May 25–28, 2011	20th International Banking Congress (IBC-2011)	Banks: Modernization, Innovations, Investments.
June 5–8, 2012	21st International Banking Congress (IBC-2012)	Banking and Bank Regulation: Strategies, Outcomes, Prospects.
June 4–7, 2013	22nd International Banking Congress (IBC-2013)	Financial Sustainability: Micro and Macro Approaches
June 30 – July 2, 2014	23rd International Banking Congress (IBC-2014)	New Realities in Banking.
June 3–5, 2015	24th International Banking Congress (IBC-2015)	The Financial Industry: Challenges and Solutions.
June 29 – July 1, 2016	25th International Financial Congress (IFC-2016)	The Future of Financial Markets.
July 12–14, 2017	26th International Financial Congress (IFC-2017)	Support of St. Petersburg and the Roscongress Foundation.
June 8-10, 2018	27th International Financial Congress (IFC-2018)	
July 4—6, 2019	28th International Financial Congress (IFC-2019)	
