= Arkady Kobyakov =

Russian singer (1976–2015)

Arkady Olegovich Kobyakov
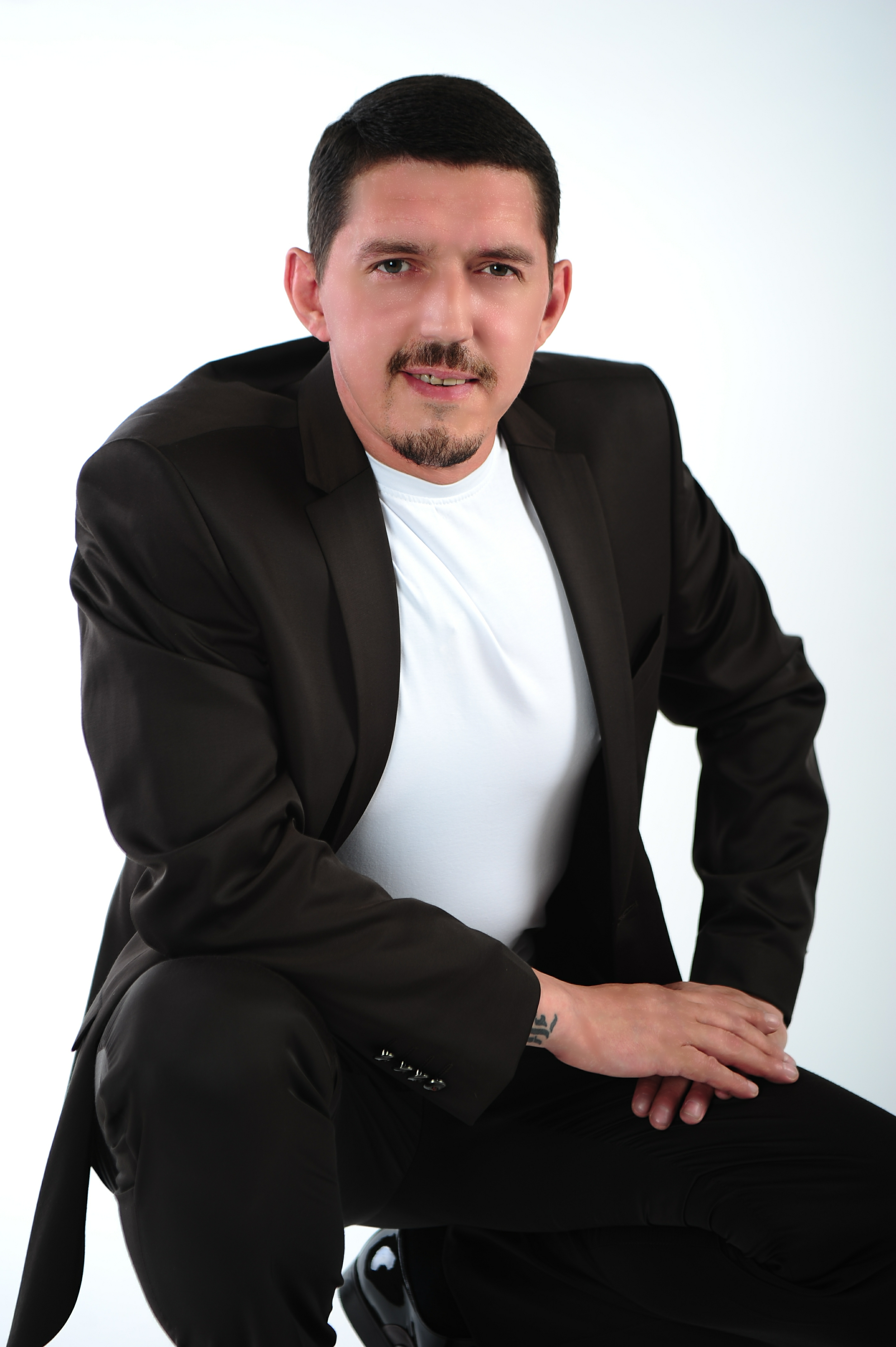

Background information
- Born: 2 June 1976; Gorky, Nizhny Novgorod, RSFSR, USSR
- Died: 19 September 2015 (aged 39) Podolsk, Russia
- Genres: Russian chanson, bard
- Occupations: singer, poet, composer
- Website: arkady-kobyakov.ru

Arkady Olegovich Kobyakov (2 June 1976, Nizhny Novgorod – 19 September 2015, Podolsk) was a Russian singer.

== Early life ==
Arkady was born on 2 June 1976 in Gorky (now Nizhny Novgorod). Father, Kobyakov Oleg Glebovich, worked as a chief mechanic of a motor depot, and his mother Volkova Tatyana Yurievna worked in a toy factory. Arkady was an only child. At an early age a kindergarten teacher advised the parents for Arkady to attend music school. At the age of 6 at the insistence of his grandmother, he enrolled in the Nizhny Novgorod boys' choral chapel (now Nizhny Novgorod choral College. L. K. Sivukhina), where he learned the rudiments of music on piano.

The grandmother played an important role in his education—she instilled in him a love for music, to accept life for what it is, and to treat everything philosophically.

When Arkady was still a child, his mother left the family, leaving him with his father, and showed no further interest in her son.

At age 14 Kobyakov was sentenced to 3.5 years in Ardatovskiy educational-labor colony for minors.

Shortly before his release in December 1993, his father died. This tragic event left a deep mark in his soul and, experiencing a sense of loss of his father, he increasingly manifested hostility to his mother, who had gone to another man.

While confined Kobyakov became interested in songwriting. He wrote about eighty songs. He shot seven videos. Kobyakov gradually became known to the Russian public. He was released in 2006. He began working as a singer in restaurants and at corporate events.

== Adulthood ==
At the end of 2008 he was sentenced to five years for fraud. He continued to write songs. In 2011, he performed for prisoners with singer Yuri Ivanovich Bone. Later he produced his first official album, Prisoner's Soul.

In the spring of 2013 he was released. On May 24, in the Moscow club under the name "Butyrka", he gave a recital.

At 5:30 am on September 19, 2015, Arkady Kobyakov died in his producer Sergey Lekomtsev's apartment in Podolsk from a stomach ulcer.
