= St. Petersburg International Legal Forum =

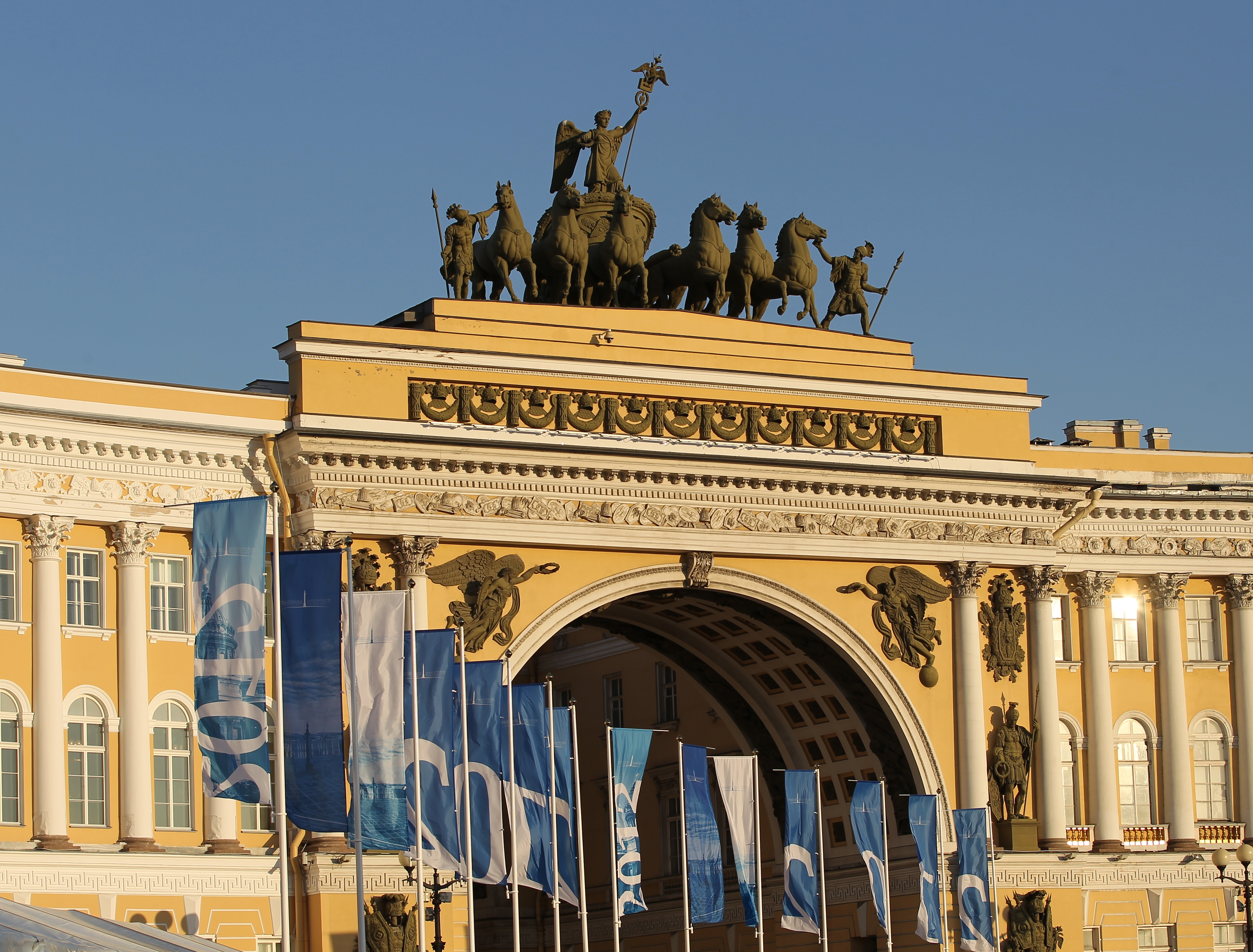
The General Staff Building where the II St. Petersburg International Legal Forum was held

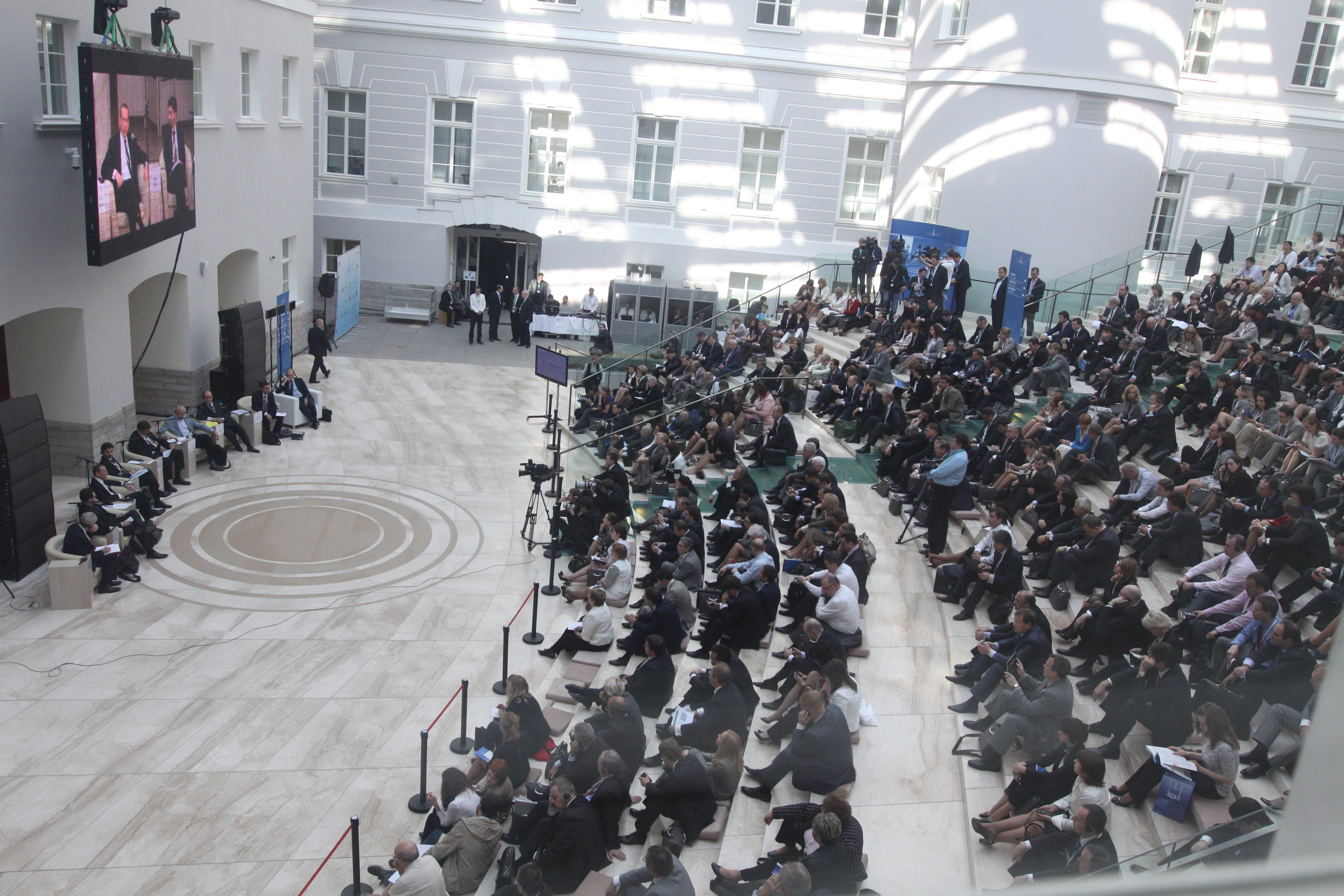
Roundtable discussion “Mechanisms of Realization of Open Government Initiative in a Legal System”, II St. Petersburg International Legal Forum

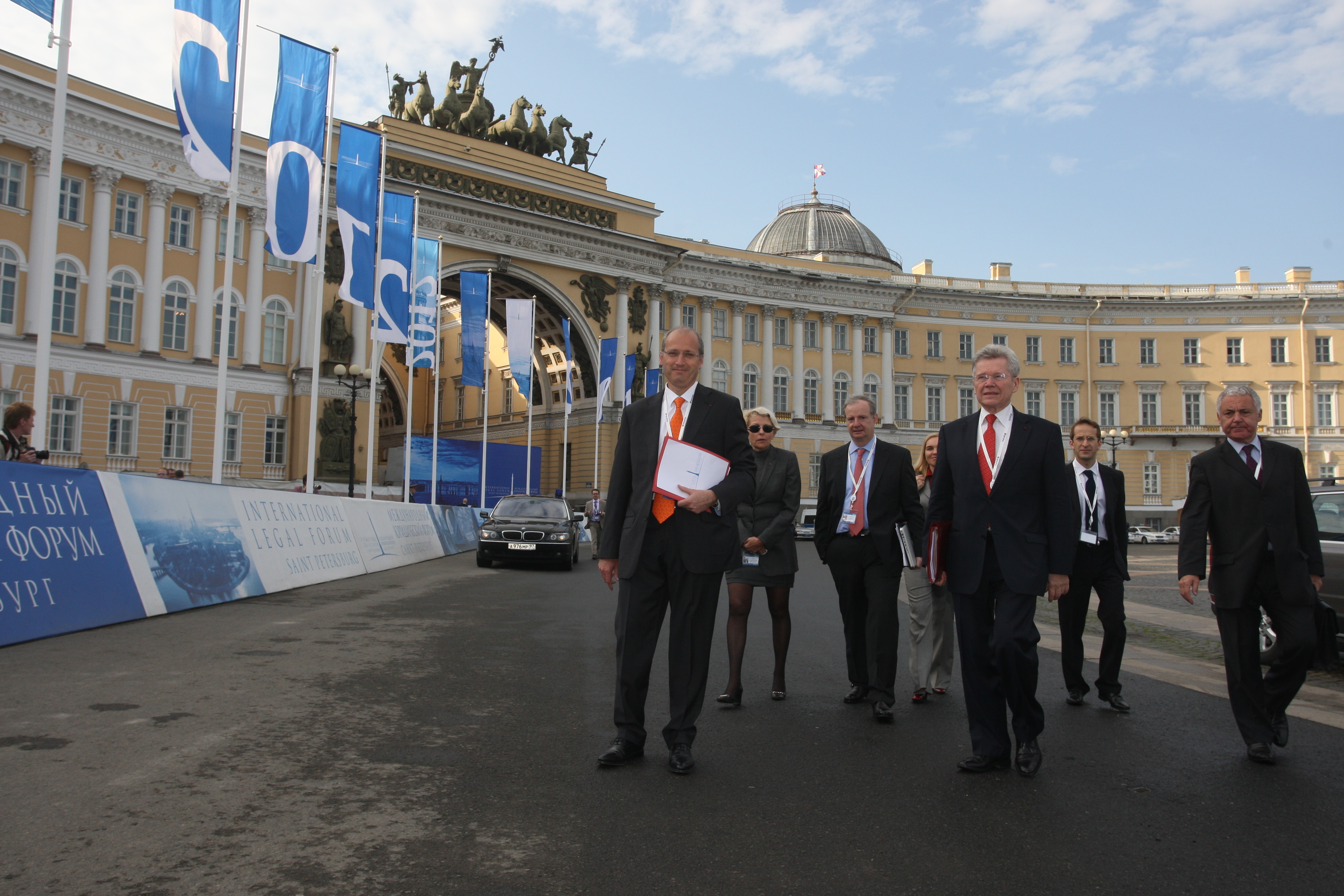
Participants of the II St. Petersburg International Legal Forum, Palace Square

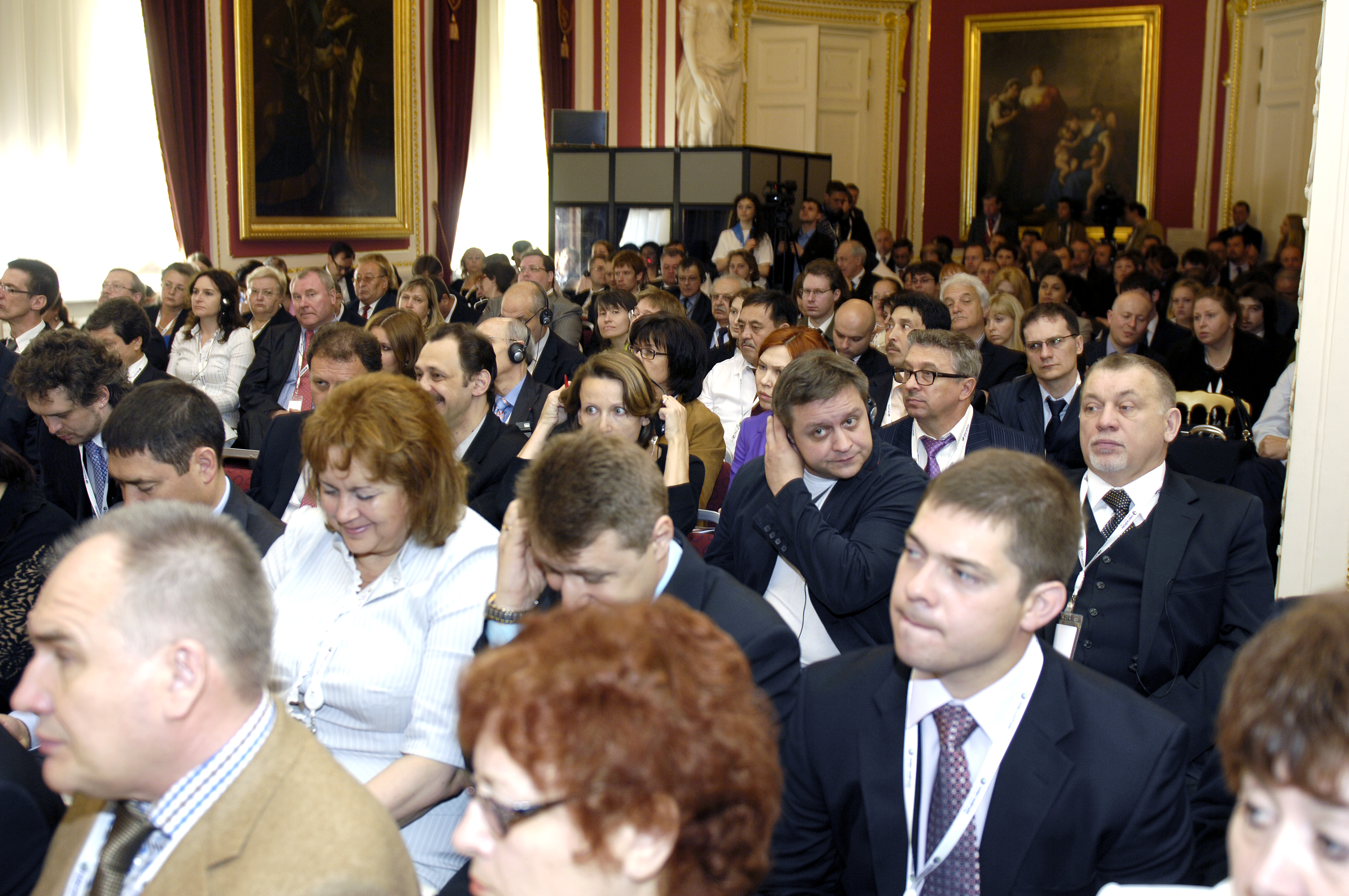
Discussion Session, I St. Petersburg International Legal Forum, Mikhailovsky Castle

St. Petersburg International Legal Forum is an annual international legal conference that was established in 2011 on the initiative of the Ministry of Justice of the Russian Federation and is supported by the President of the Russian Federation. IT occurs annually in Saint Petersburg.
