= American Chamber of Commerce in Russia =

Foreign business organization operating in Russia

- Abbreviation: AmCham Russia
- Formation: 1994
- Type: Foreign business organization
- Purpose: Advocates trade and investment interests
- Headquarters: Moscow
- Region served: Russia
- Leader: Robert Agee
- Website: http://www.amcham.ru

The American Chamber of Commerce in Russia (AmCham Russia) is the leading foreign business organization operating in the Russian Federation. Founded in 1994, AmCham advocates the trade and investment interests of its member companies, which include major U.S. Corporations, as well as large European and Russian companies. The Chamber advances commercial relations between the Russian Federation and the international community by promoting an investment-friendly environment. In so doing, the Chamber maintains a constant dialogue with the Russian government to protect and promote the economic interests of member companies.

Headquartered in Moscow, under the leadership of Robert Agee, President & CEO, and with a regional office in St. Petersburg, the Chamber is an independent, non-government organization that is well situated to promote the business interests of its members in the Russian market both at the federal and regional levels. Simultaneously, the Chamber works closely with U.S. business leaders and policymakers through representation in Washington D.C. and has played a significant role in supporting Russia's accession to WTO and Permanent Normal Trade Relations for Russia.

For 27 years, AmCham has provided an essential forum for dialogue between the international business community and key policymakers in Russia and the United States. As its membership continues to grow and diversify, so does the scope and reach of its advocacy.

AmCham's policy priorities range from assisting individual members in resolving concrete problems to helping create a fair playing field for international businesses in Russia through the advancement of administrative and legislative reforms at the regional and federal level and the protection of property rights.

The Chamber also focuses on the development of international economic and business ties at the regional level. AmCham regularly schedules trade missions during which members can meet with the heads of local administration and regional business leaders. Meanwhile, AmCham offers important forums in which Russian regions can promote their investment potential.

AmCham actively works with major Russian business associations including The Chamber of Commerce and Industry (ТПП РФ) and the Russian Union of Industrialists and Entrepreneurs (РСПП) and has contributed in the adoption of many legislative acts aimed at promoting investment and the development of the private sector in Russia.

== Committees ==
AmCham Russia Committees - Moscow Headquarters:

- Banking & Finance
- Business Ethics & Compliance
- Customs and Transportation
- Education
- Energy
- Enterprise Development
- Environment
- Healthcare
- Human Resources
- Innovation & Technology (ICT)
- Legal Affairs
- Leasing
- Marketing & Communications
- NGO-Corporate Partnership
- Real Estate and Construction
- Security
- Taxation

AmCham Russia Committees - St. Petersburg Regional Office:

- Automotive
- Customs & Transportation
- Environment, Health & Safety
- Human Resources (HR)
- Information Technologies & Telecommunications (IT)
- Investment & Legal
- Manufacturing
- Public Relations (PR)
- Procurement
- Taxation
- Safety & Security
- Tourism & Hospitality

== See also ==
- United States Chamber of Commerce
