= Expoforum =

Large-scale exhibition and business center in Saint-Petersburg, Russia

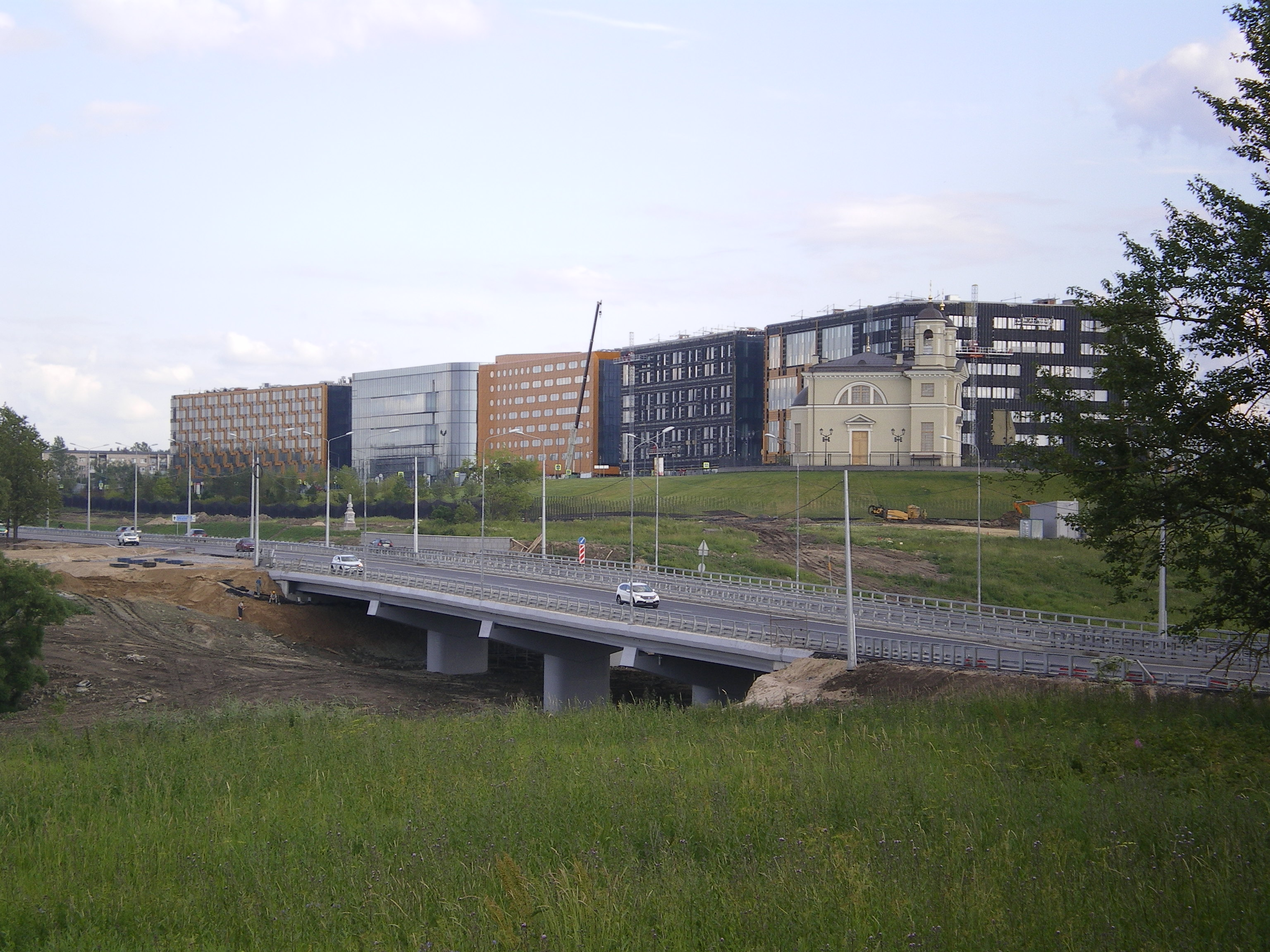
General view

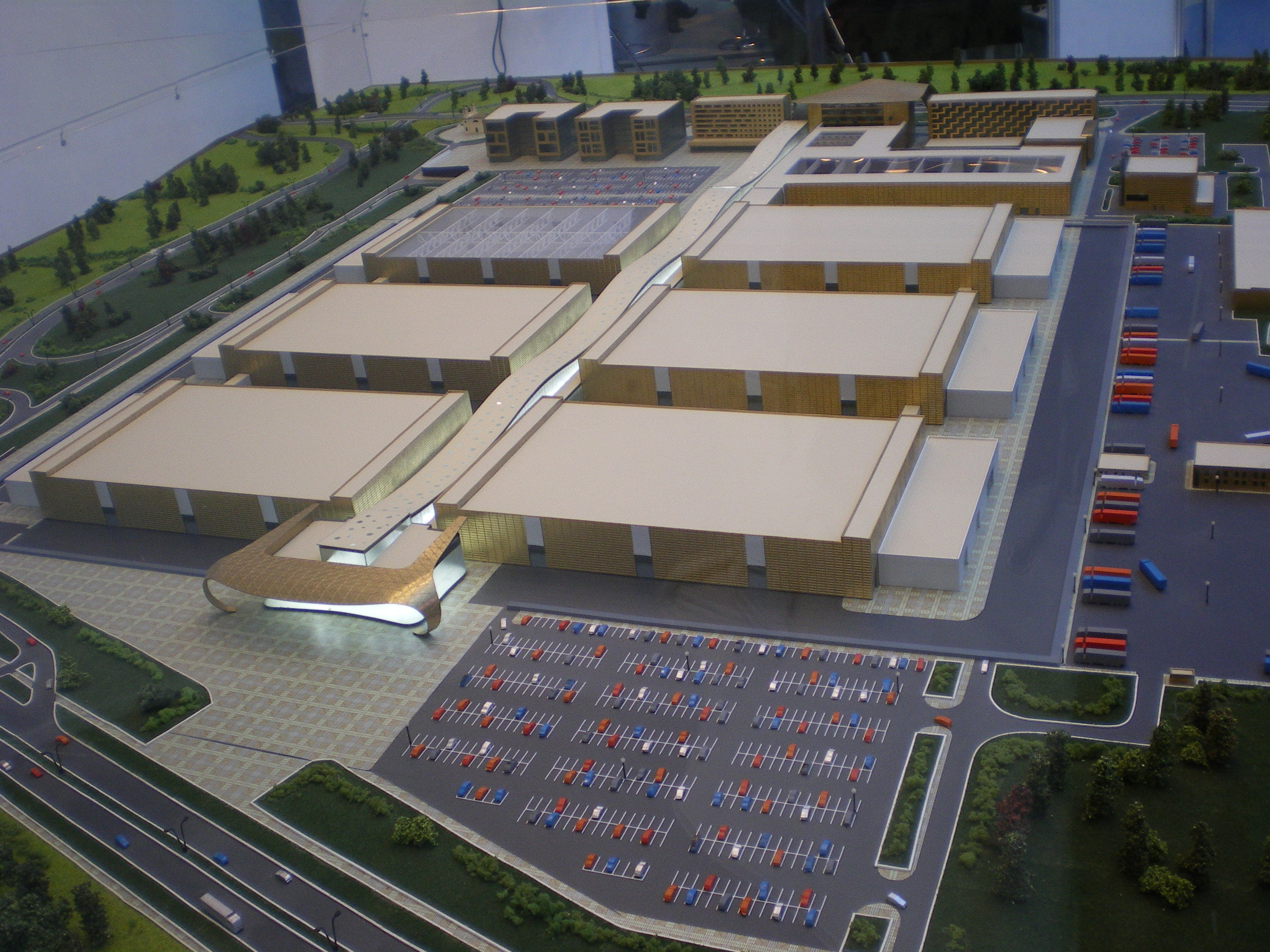
Scale model at Lenexpo

Expoforum is a large-scale exhibition and business center in Saint-Petersburg, Russia. It is situated between the city's main Pulkovo Airport and inner-city historically significant Pushkin town formerly known as Tsarskoye Selo.

It is aimed to substitute older and smaller Lenexpo complex built in 1968. It was opened on October 7, 2014 by local governor Poltavchenko and was under construction until 2016.

The complex features 3 helicopter pads and has adjacent Eastern Orthodox church dedicated to Theotokos of Smolensk venerated icon. The church is the replica of the older Pulkovskaya church situated nearby in the past.

One of the main goals for Expoforum foundation was to become the base location for St. Petersburg International Economic Forum instead of older Lenexpo. The first forum at the new location was held in 2016.

The International Financial Congress was held at Expoforum.

== Links ==
- Official page
