= Perkiomen =

Perkiomen may refer to one of the following entities, all located in Montgomery County, Pennsylvania, unless stated otherwise:

== Communities ==
- Perkiomen Junction, a neighborhood of Phoenixville, Pennsylvania, in Chester County
- Perkiomen Township, Pennsylvania, a township of the second class
- Perkiomenville, Pennsylvania, an unincorporated community

== Schools ==
- Perkiomen School, a private school in Pennsburg
- Perkiomen Valley Academy, an alternative educational center in Frederick
- Perkiomen Valley School District
- Upper Perkiomen High School, a public school in Pennsburg
- Upper Perkiomen School District

== Other ==
- Perkiomen Valley Airport, in Collegeville
- Perkiomen Creek, in Berks, Lehigh and Montgomery counties
  - East Branch Perkiomen Creek, a tributary of Perkiomen Creek
- Perkiomen Bridge, in Collegeville
  - Perkiomen Bridge Hotel, an adjacent historic hotel complex
- Perkiomen Trail, which runs along Perkiomen Creek

== See also ==
- Perquimans County, North Carolina
