= Perkiomen Trail =

Multi-use rail trail along the Perkiomen Creek in Pennsylvania

Coordinates: 40.23550°N 75.45424°W

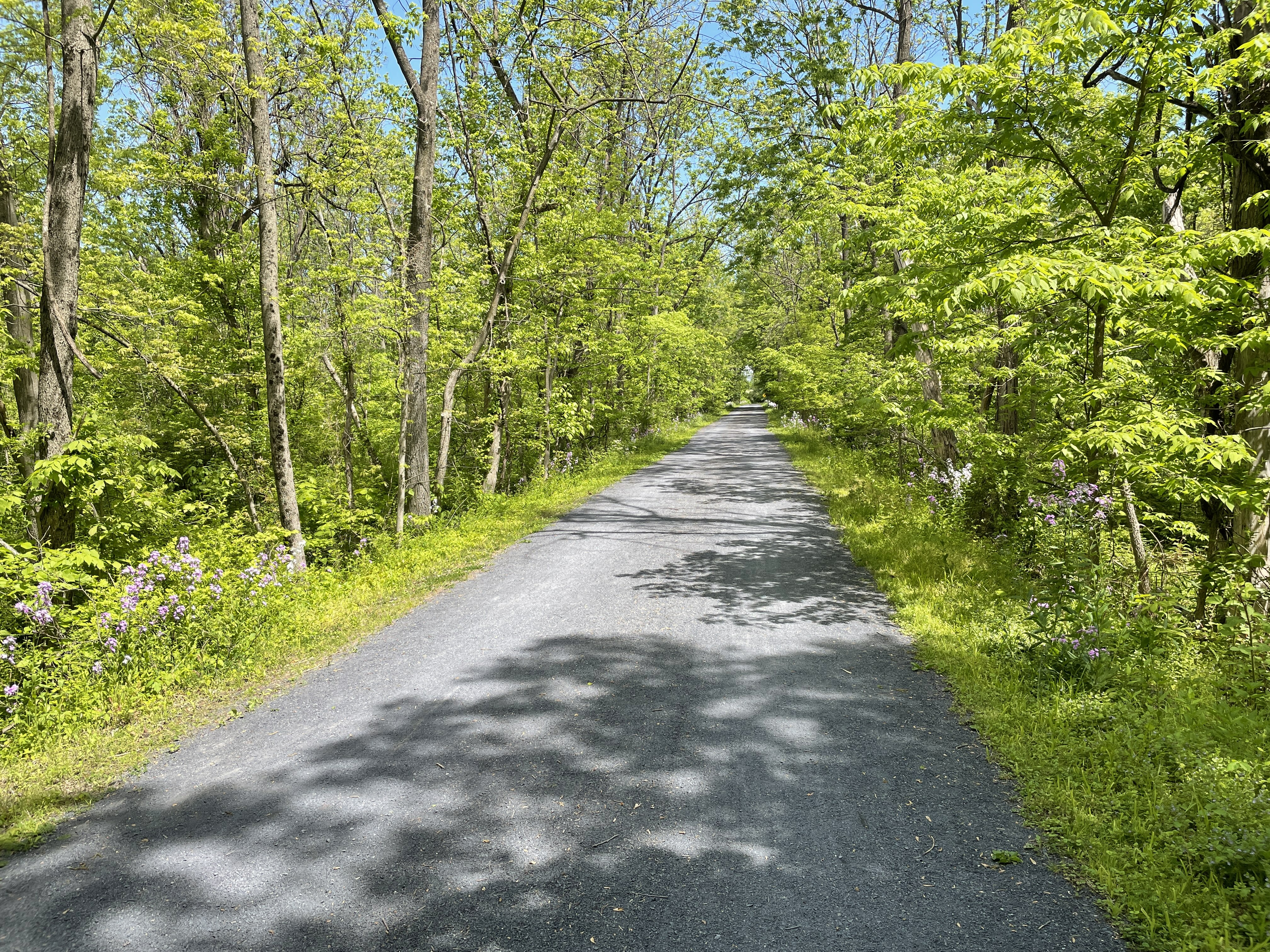
- Perkiomen Trail north of Collegeville
- Length: 19 mi (31 km)
- Location: Montgomery County, Pennsylvania, U.S.
- Trailheads: South: Oaks, Pennsylvania; North: Green Lane, Pennsylvania
- Use: Multi-use
- Difficulty: Easy
- Season: Year-round
- Surface: Mostly Gravel, Some Paved
- Right of way: Perkiomen Line of the Reading Railroad

Trail map
- Map of Perkiomen Trail with other existing and proposed trails in black

Trail Marker

The Perkiomen Trail is a 19-mile-long (31 km) multi-use rail trail along the Perkiomen Creek in Pennsylvania.

It begins at the junction with the Schuylkill River Trail near the mouth of the Perkiomen and Valley Forge National Historical Park and ends in the borough of Green Lane. It follows the Perkiomen and connects Lower Perkiomen Valley Park, Central Perkiomen Valley Park, Meadow Park, Foy Park, William Rahmer Park, and Green Lane Park. The trail is mostly gravel, with some sections being paved. The trail connects with Skippack Trail, Park-to-Perk Connector Trail, Green Lane Park's Reservoir Connector Trail, and PA Highlands Trail.

The abandoned portion of Perkiomen Branch of the Reading Railroad was purchased by Montgomery County in 1978, and the trail mostly follows the former railroad bed. It was completed in 2003.

It passes through ten communities (from south to north): Oaks, Arcola, Yerkes, Collegeville, Rahns, Graterford, Schwenksville, Spring Mount, Upper Salford, and Green Lane.

Natural Lands and the Montgomery County Lands Trust have spent over $7 million to establish an easement to ensure that this trail remains an open space in Montgomery County, Pennsylvania.

== Sites ==
The Perkiomen Trail abuts a number of sites.

- Spring Mountain Ski Area
- Philadelphia Folk Festival
- Green Lane Park
