= Upper Providence Township, Montgomery County, Pennsylvania =

Township in Pennsylvania, US

Upper Providence Township
- Township
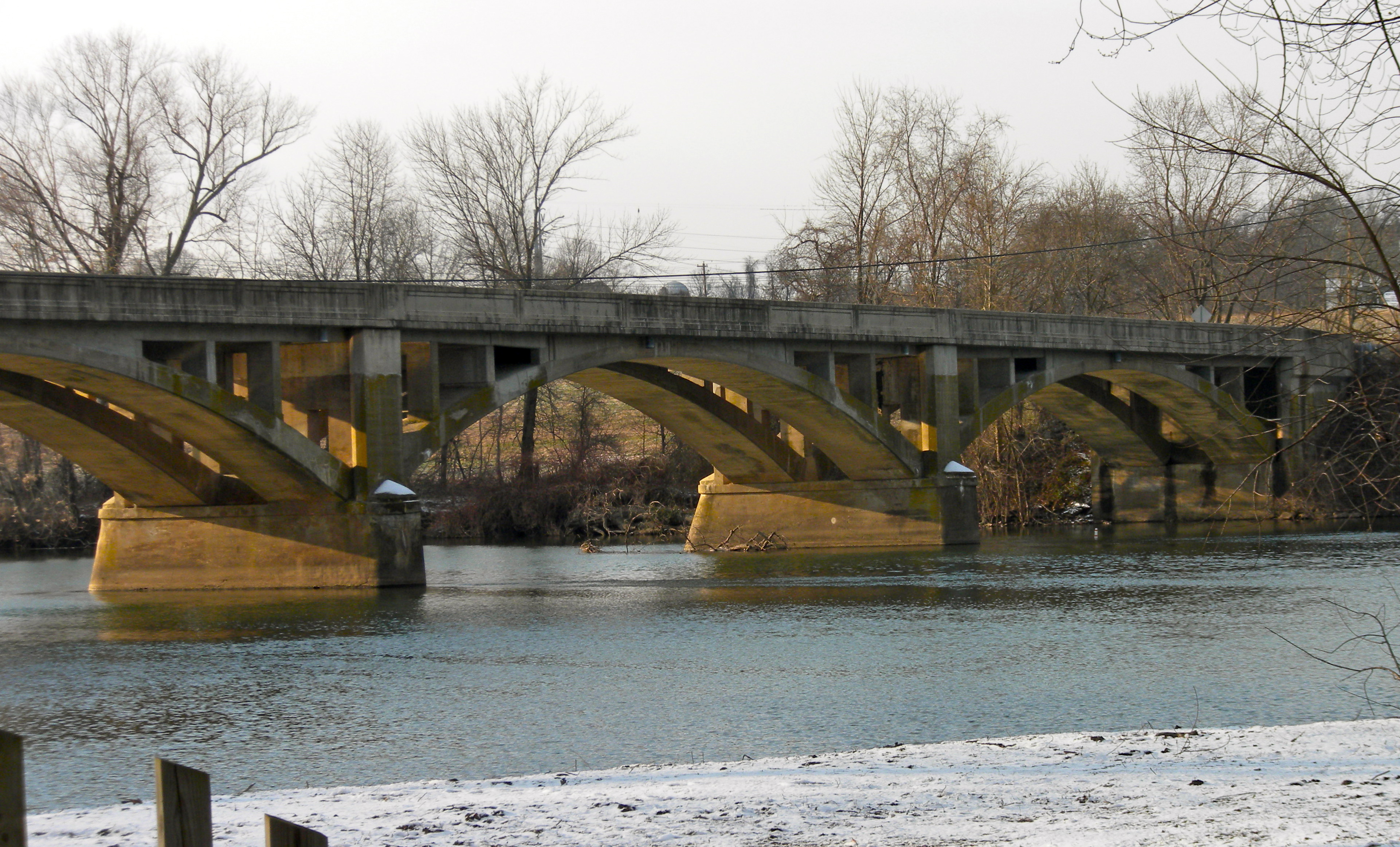
- Black Rock Bridge over the Schuylkill River, January 2018

- Flag Logo

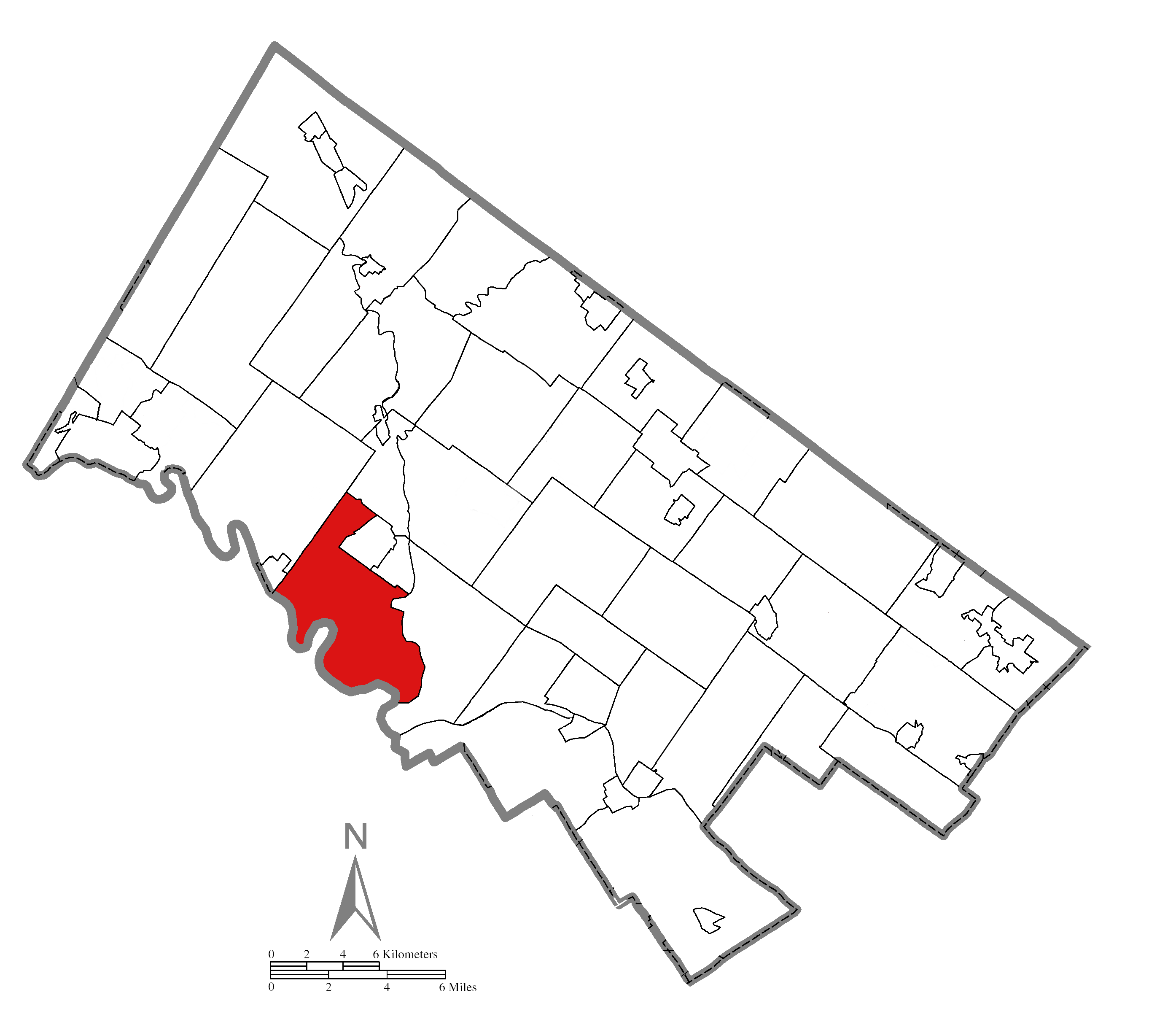
- Location of Upper Providence Township in Montgomery County

- Pennsylvania
- Coordinates: 40°07′24″N 75°27′29″W
- Country: United States
- State: Pennsylvania
- County: Montgomery
- Established: 1805

Area
  - Total: 18.17 sq mi (47.05 km^{2})
  - Land: 17.81 sq mi (46.13 km^{2})
  - Water: 0.36 sq mi (0.92 km^{2})
- Elevation: 105 ft (32 m)

Population (2010)
  - Total: 21,219
  - Estimate (2016): 23,853
  - Density: 1,339.4/sq mi (517.13/km^{2})
- Time zone: UTC-5 (EST)
  - Summer (DST): UTC-4 (EDT)
- Area code: 610
- FIPS code: 42-091-79256
- Website: www.uprov-montco.org

Upper Providence Township is a township in Montgomery County, Pennsylvania, United States. As of the 2010 census, the township population was 21,219.

== History ==
William Penn, the founder and first governor of the colonial-era Province of Pennsylvania, originally owned the land that is present-day Upper Providence. After selling off most of the land, he kept a large tract on the east side of the Schuylkill River, which included Upper and Lower Providence and parts of Perkiomen and Worcester. William Penn named the land “The Manor of Gilberts” after his mother's maiden name.

The first person to settle in this area was Edward Lane, who bought 2,500 acres of land from William Penn in 1701. Edward and his wife established the Episcopal church in Lower Providence. In 1717, John Jacob Schrack came to the township from Germany. Schrack was able to convince Rev. Henry Melchior Muhlenberg to relocate to this area. Muhlenberg was the founder of the Lutheran church in the United States, the first of which was founded in Trappe.

In March 1725, the farmers formed the township, which was then called Providence and included Upper and Lower Providence.

Upper Providence Township was established in 1805 by the division of the former Providence Township along the Perkiomen Creek. In 1896, the Boroughs of Collegeville and Trappe were created from northeastern portions of the township, yielding the present township boundaries.

=== Schuylkill Canal ===
The Schuylkill Canal was built to help navigate past rapids on the Schuylkill River between Norristown and Pottstown. It was completed in 1825 and was approximately five miles long, extending from Black Rock dam (Lock 60) to Pawlings dam at the Perkiomen creek in Oaks (Lock 61).

In the 1830s, Lock 60 was doubled in size and in the 1840s, the locks were expanded to handle wider boats.

The river traffic helped the surrounding area grow. The settlement of Quincyville started at Lock 60 and the settlement of Lumberville grew at Lock 61. Lumberville thrived with stables for mules, and a general store for boat supplies. In the 1840s, these towns changed names, with Quincyville becoming Mont Clare and Lumberville becoming Port Providence, which are their current names.

With the ascendancy of railroads in the mid 19th century, boat traffic diminished. However, it was supplemented by recreational boating in the 1920s. Pleasure boats ran between Philadelphia and Reading. In the 1950s, the Army Corps of Engineers dredged the Schuylkill River to remove coal silt from upriver. The lower part of the canal was used as a holding basin for the silt.

=== Railroads ===
The Philadelphia and Reading Railroad ran through Upper Providence, transporting passengers from Philadelphia and Norristown to Pottstown, Reading and finally Pottsville. Before the railroad, this trip had to be taken on stagecoaches or by horse. The railroad was constructed starting in Reading and down to Pottstown which opened in 1939. The last section between Bridgeport and Philadelphia was completed in 1842. This rail line is still in use for freight only.

The Perkiomen Railroad was a second railroad passed through Upper Providence, running from Oaks in the south to Collegeville and then Allentown in the state's Lehigh Valley region in the north. The Perkiomen Railroad opened in 1868. The railroad later closed and is now part of the Perkiomen Trail converted through the Rails to Trails initiative.

The Black Rock Bridge and Schuylkill Navigation Canal, Oakes Reach Section were listed on the National Register of Historic Places in 1988.

== Geography ==
According to the U.S. Census Bureau, the township has a total area of 18.2 square miles (47.2 km^{2}), 17.8 square miles (46.2 km^{2} of which is land and 0.4 square mile (1.0 km^{2} (2.09%) of which is water. Upper Providence is bordered to the northwest by Royersford and Limerick Township; to the northeast by Perkiomen Township, Trappe Borough, and Collegeville; to the southeast, separated by the Perkiomen Creek, is Lower Providence Township; and to the southwest, separated by the Schuylkill River, is Chester County.

== Demographics ==
Historical population
Census	Pop.	Note	%±
1930	3,628		—
1940	3,895		7.4%
1950	4,486		15.2%
1960	5,607		25.0%
1970	6,202		10.6%
1980	9,551		54.0%
1990	9,682		1.4%
2000	15,398		59.0%
2010	21,219		37.8%
2020	24,091		13.5%

As of the 2010 census, the township was 86.6% White, 3.5% Black or African American, 0.1% Native American, 7.9% Asian, and 1.5% were two or more races. 2.2% of the population were of Hispanic or Latino ancestry.

As of the 2000 census, there were 15,398 people, 5,355 households, and 4,101 families residing in the township. The population density was 862.9 inhabitants per square mile (333.2/km^{2}). There were 5,545 housing units at an average density of 310.7 per square mile (120.0/km^{2}). The racial makeup of the township was 93.51% White, 2.57% African American, 0.10% Native American, 2.77% Asian, 0.03% Pacific Islander, 0.27% from other races, and 0.76% from two or more races. Hispanic or Latino of any race were 1.34% of the population.

There were 5,355 households, out of which 42.2% had children under the age of 18 living with them, 65.6% were married couples living together, 8.4% had a female householder with no husband present, and 23.4% were non-families. 18.7% of all households were made up of individuals, and 4.1% had someone living alone who was 65 years of age or older. The average household size was 2.77 and the average family size was 3.20.

In Upper Providence Township, the population was spread out, with 28.1% under the age of 18, 4.8% from 18 to 24, 37.5% from 25 to 44, 19.7% from 45 to 64, and 9.9% who were 65 years of age or older. The median age was 35 years. For every 100 females there were 90.8 males. For every 100 females age 18 and over, there were 87.4 males.

The median income for a household in the township was $75,789, and the median income for a family was $85,660. Males had a median income of $54,764 versus $37,193 for females. The per capita income for the township was $31,251. About 1.1% of families and 1.5% of the population were below the poverty line, including 1.6% of those under age 18 and 0.7% of those age 65 or over.

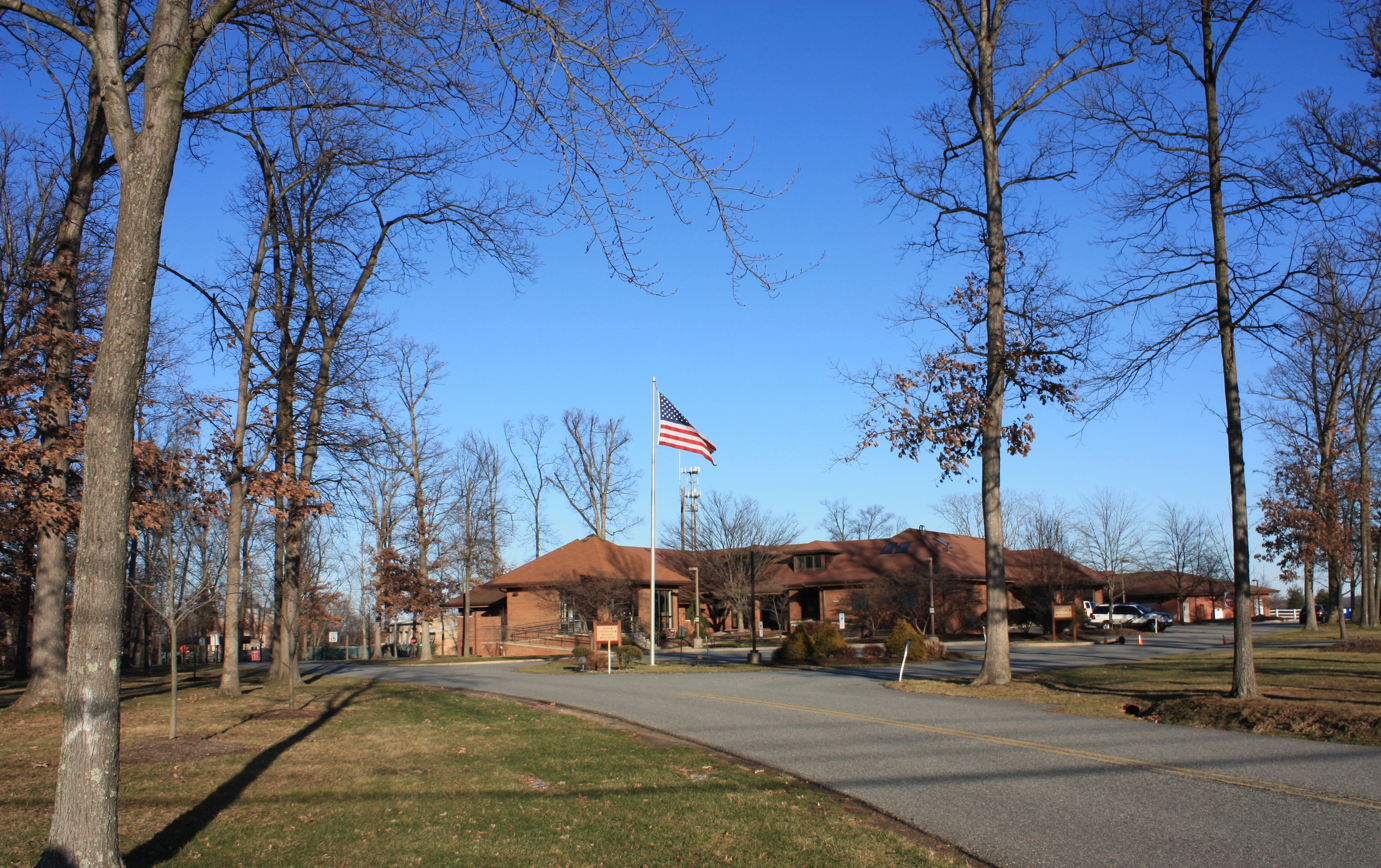
Upper Providence Township municipal building

Presidential elections results
Year	Republican	Democrat
2024	42.8% 6,591	55.9% 8,607
2020	41.2% 6,031	56.9% 8,320
2016	44.2% 5,134	51.1% 5,993
2012	50.7% 5,280	48.0% 4,993
2008	45.7% 4,681	53.5% 5,480
2004	53.6% 4,590	45.9% 3,928
2000	51.9% 3,198	45.0% 2,770
1996	45.1% 1,980	41.0% 1,802
1992	40.2% 1,682	35.7% 1,495

== Communities ==
The following are unincorporated communities within Upper Providence.

- Arcola
- Mingo
- Mont Clare
- Oaks
- Port Providence
- Yerkes

== Transportation ==
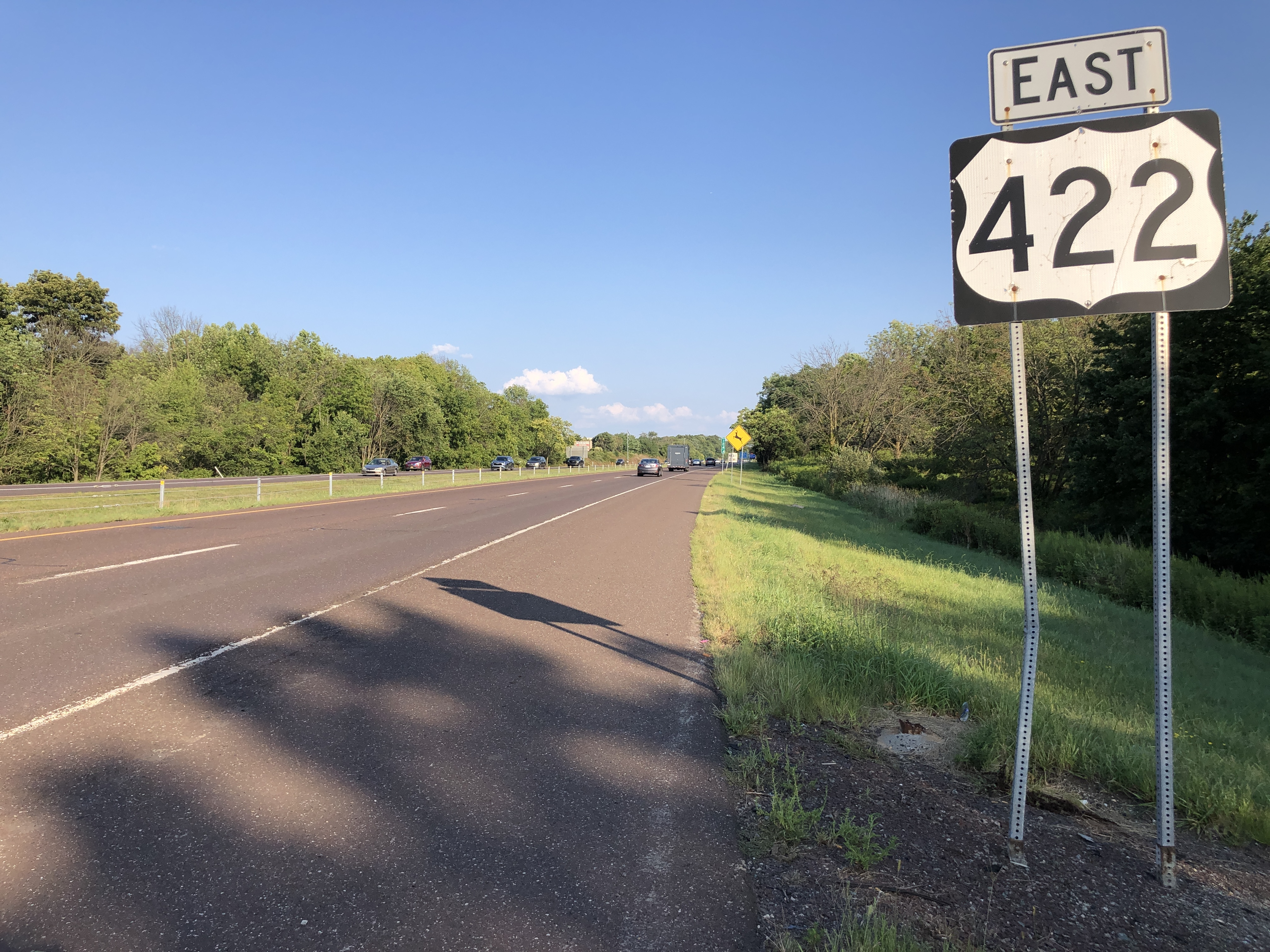
U.S Route 422 eastbound in Upper Providence Township

As of 2017 there were 112.64 miles (181.28 km) of public roads in Upper Providence Township, of which 29.35 miles (47.23 km) were maintained by the Pennsylvania Department of Transportation (PennDOT) and 83.29 miles (134.04 km) were maintained by the township.

U.S. Route 422 is the main highway serving Upper Providence Township. It traverses the township via the Pottstown Expressway on a northwest-to-southeast alignment. Pennsylvania Route 29 and Pennsylvania Route 113 also traverse the township, following parallel northeast-to-southwest alignments across the central portion of the township.

SEPTA provides Suburban Bus service to Upper Providence Township along Route 93, which runs between the Norristown Transportation Center in Norristown and Pottstown, Route 99, which runs between the Norristown Transportation Center and Phoenixville, and Route 139, which runs between the King of Prussia Transit Center at the King of Prussia Mall and Limerick.

== Education ==
Upper Providence Township is a member of the Spring-Ford Area School District.

== Economy ==
The Providence Town Center, an open-air lifestyle center, is located in Upper Providence Township at the interchange between U.S. Route 422 and Pennsylvania Route 29.
