= PVA =

PVA may refer to:

== Science and technology ==
- Paraventricular nucleus of hypothalamus, a part of the brain
- Patterned vertical alignment, a thin-film-transistor liquid-crystal display technology
- Poikiloderma vasculare atrophicans, a skin disease
- Polyvinyl acetate, an adhesive used for porous materials like wood, paper, and cloth
- Polyvinyl alcohol, a water-soluble synthetic polymer
- Population viability analysis, a risk-assessment method used in conservation biology
- Positive vorticity advection in meteorology
- Potato virus A, an agricultural disease

== Other uses ==
- Paralyzed Veterans of America, a veterans' service organization
- Kinder High School for the Performing and Visual Arts, in Houston, Texas, U.S.
- Perkiomen Valley Academy, in Pennsylvania, U.S.
- People's Volunteer Army, the Chinese armed forces active during the Korean War
- El Embrujo Airport, in Providencia Island, Colombia, IATA code PVA
- PVA (band), English music band
- Patrick van Aanholt, Dutch professional footballer
