= D. Reiner Faringer =

American physician & football player (1883 – 1969)

Biographical details
- Born: September 17, 1883; Upper Providence Township, Montgomery County, Pennsylvania, U.S.
- Died: May 11, 1969 (aged 85)

Playing career

Football
- 1902–1905: Ursinus

Coaching career (HC unless noted)

Football
- 1906: Ursinus

Head coaching record
- Overall: 1–8

David Reiner Faringer Sr. (September 17, 1883 – May 11, 1969) was an American football player and coach. Faringer played college football at Ursinus College, where he was also served as the head football coach in 1906. Faringer graduated from the University of Pennsylvania School of Medicine in 1909 and later had a general medical practice in Philadelphia. He died on May 11, 1969.

== Head coaching record ==
Year	Team	Overall	Conference	Standing	Bowl/playoffs
Ursinus (Independent) (1906)
1906	Ursinus	1–8			
Ursinus:		1–8			
Total:		1–8			
