= Black Rock Bridge =

- U.S. National Register of Historic Places
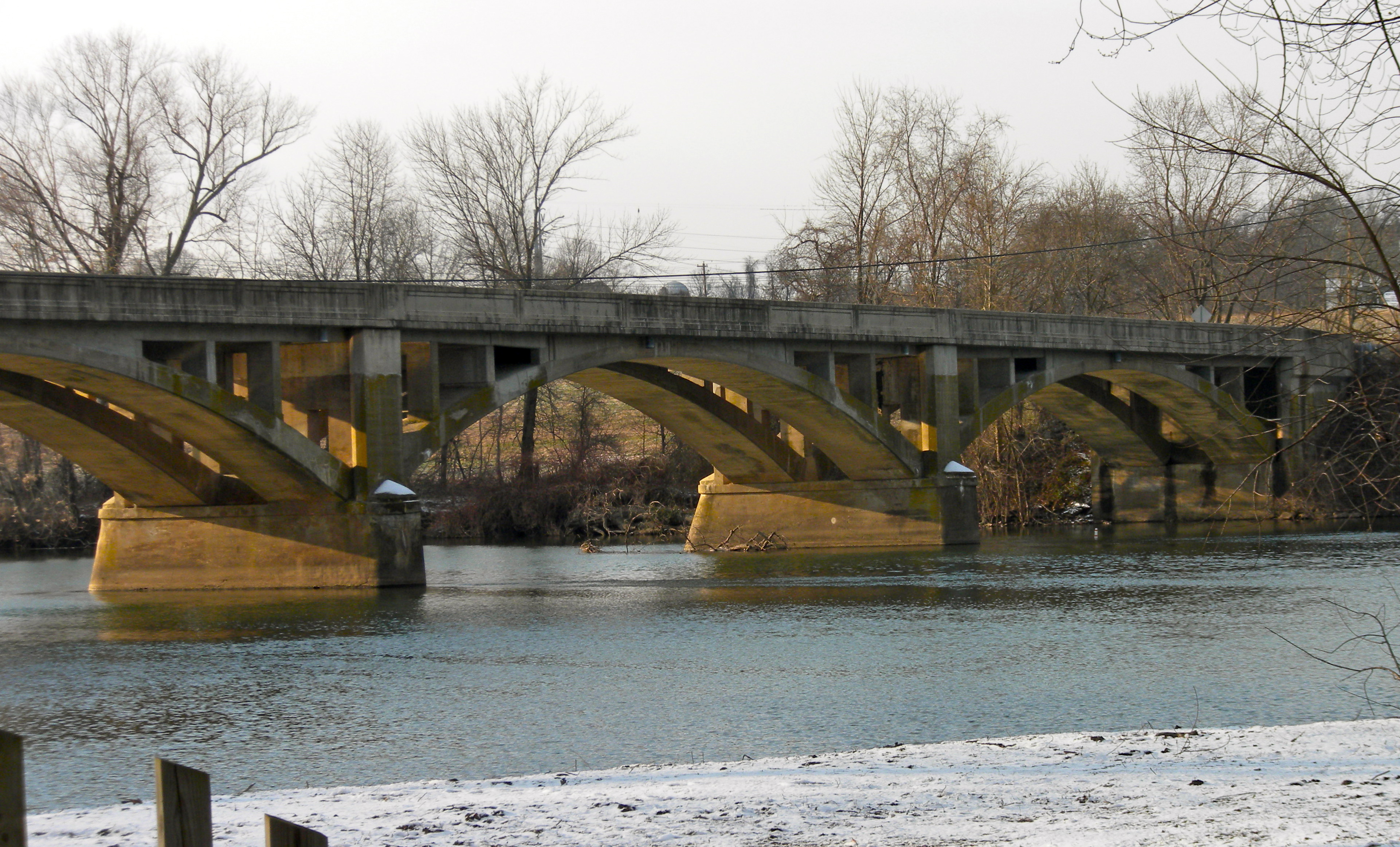
- Black Rock Bridge, January 2010

- Location within Pennsylvania Location within the United States
- Location: Pennsylvania Route 113 over the Schuylkill River, Phoenixville and Upper Providence Township, Pennsylvania
- Coordinates: 40°9′32″N 75°30′44″W
- Area: less than one acre
- Built: 1927
- Built by: G.A. Wagman, F.M. Wagman
- Architectural style: Multi-span spandrel arch
- MPS: Highway Bridges Owned by the Commonwealth of Pennsylvania, Department of Transportation TR
- NRHP reference No.: 88000735
- Added to NRHP: June 22, 1988

Black Rock Bridge is a historic concrete arch bridge carrying Pennsylvania Route 113 across the Schuylkill River between Phoenixville, Chester County, Pennsylvania, and Upper Providence Township, Montgomery County, Pennsylvania. It has five spans; three main spans are each 116 feet (35 m) long and flanked by two 103-foot-long (31 m) spans. The bridge was constructed in 1927, and features open-spandrel arches and solid concrete parapet walls.

It was listed on the National Register of Historic Places in 1988.
