= William and Caroline Schall House =

Historic house in Pennsylvania, United States

- U.S. National Register of Historic Places
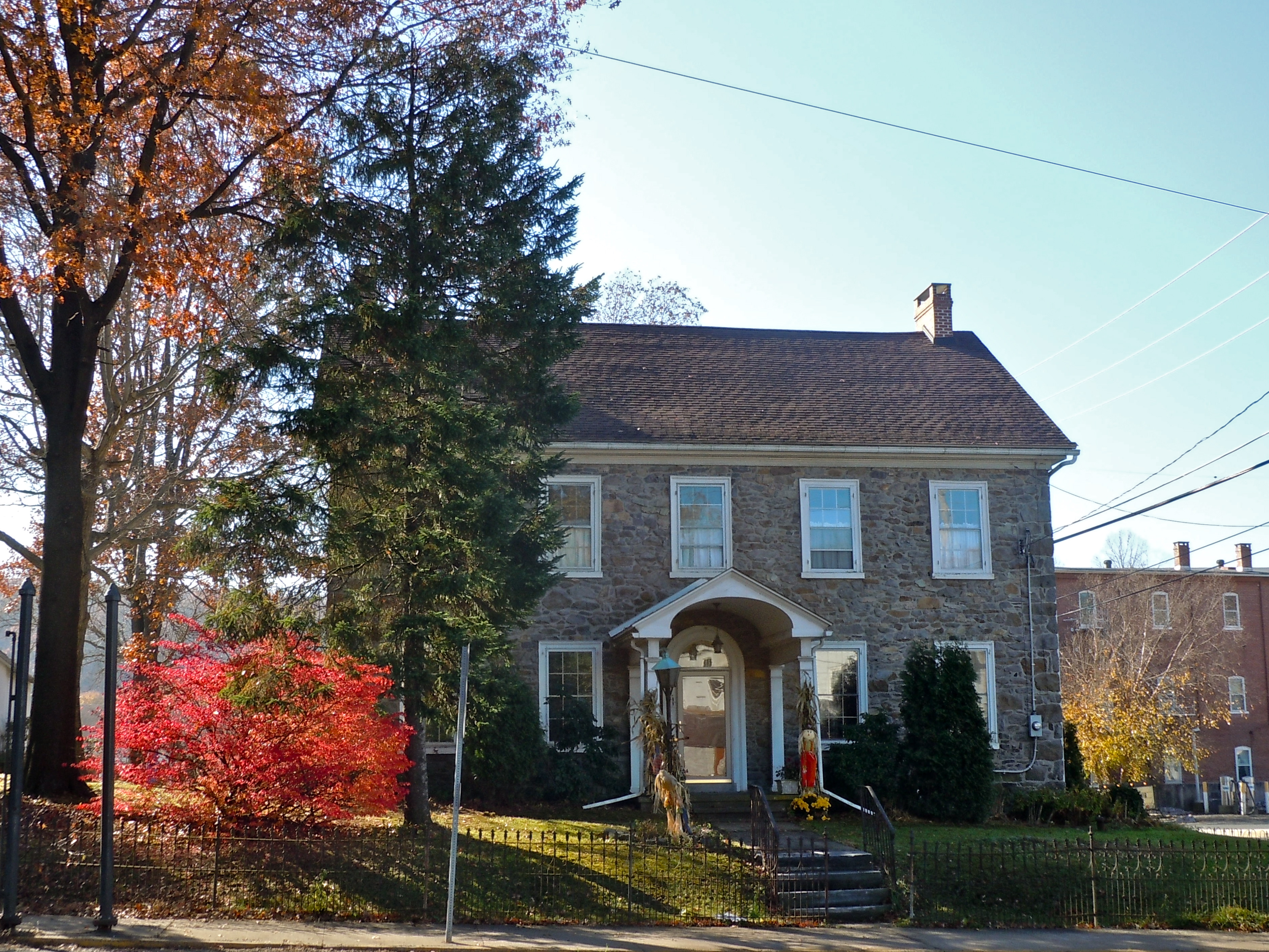
- Schall House, November 2011

- Location within Pennsylvania Location within the United States
- Interactive map showing the Schall House’s location
- Location: 100 Main St., Green Lane, Pennsylvania, U.S.
- Coordinates: 40°20′19″N 75°28′19″W
- Area: less than one acre
- Built: c. 1835
- Architectural style: Federal
- NRHP reference No.: 07001079
- Added to NRHP: October 11, 2007

The William and Caroline Schall House is an historic home that is located in Green Lane in Montgomery County, Pennsylvania, United States.

It was added to the National Register of Historic Places in 2007.

== History and architectural features ==
Built circa 1835, this historic residence was designed in the Federal style and is a 2 1/2-story, five-bay, L-shaped, stone dwelling with an open, two-story porch. A Colonial Revival style portico was added to the front facade circa 1925. Also located on the property is a contributing, stucco-covered wash house that was also built circa 1835.
