= Yerkes, Pennsylvania =

Unincorporated community in Pennsylvania, US

- Unincorporated community
- Location within Pennsylvania
- Coordinates: 40°10′11″N 75°27′49″W
- Country: United States
- State: Pennsylvania
- County: Montgomery
- Township: Upper Providence
- Elevation: 115 ft (35 m)
- Time zone: UTC-5 (Eastern (EST))
  - Summer (DST): UTC-4 (EDT)
- ZIP code: 19426
- Area codes: 610 and 484
- GNIS feature ID: 1191885

Yerkes is an unincorporated village in Upper Providence Township, Montgomery County, Pennsylvania, United States, just southwest of Collegeville. Yerkes is situated at a former road crossing of the Perkiomen Creek.
