= Providence Town Center =

- Location: Upper Providence Township, Montgomery County, Pennsylvania, United States
- Coordinates: 40.1654°N 75.4780°W
- Opened: October 2009
- Developer: Brandolini Companies, Inc.
- Manager: Finmarc Management Inc. and KPR Centers
- Owner: Finmarc Management Inc. and KPR Centers
- Num. of stores: 70
- Floor area: 758,000 sq ft (70,421 m^{2})
- Parking: street parking, parking lot
- Public transit: SEPTA bus: 99
- Website: providencetowncenter.com

Providence Town Center is a lifestyle center located near Collegeville in Upper Providence Township, Montgomery County, Pennsylvania. It is located at the interchange between U.S. Route 422 and Pennsylvania Route 29. The Providence Town Center has Wegmans, Movie Tavern, Best Buy, LA Fitness, Dick's Sporting Goods, Michaels, and PetSmart as anchors.

== History ==
Providence Town Center was developed by Brandolini Companies, Inc. The first phase of Providence Town Center opened in October 2009, consisting of Wegmans and several other large retailers.

At this time, the center was 73 percent leased and several retailers had pulled out of plans of opening stores at the center because of the Great Recession that was occurring. These issues caused the second phase of the Providence Town Center to be delayed.

Movie Tavern opened at the Providence Town Center in spring 2011. By this time, more retailers started showing interest in opening at Providence Town Center.

In 2012, work on the second phase of Providence Town Center took place, adding several new retailers and restaurants.

In 2022, Providence Town Center was sold by Brandolini Companies, Inc. to Finmarc Management Inc. and KPR Centers for $161.75 million.
