= List of Pennsylvania state historical markers in Montgomery County =

Location of Montgomery County in Pennsylvania

This is a list of the Pennsylvania state historical markers in Montgomery County.

This is intended to be a complete list of the official state historical markers placed in Montgomery County, Pennsylvania by the Pennsylvania Historical and Museum Commission (PHMC). The locations of the historical markers, as well as the latitude and longitude coordinates as provided by the PHMC's database, are included below when available. There are 60 historical markers located in Montgomery County.

== Historical markers ==
Marker title	Image	Date dedicated	Location	Marker type	Topics
Abington Presbyterian Church		May 24, 1992	Old York & Susquehanna Sts., Abington; 40.11418°N 75.1219°W	City	Religion
Ashbridge Memorial Park		1700's	Near Shipley	Roadside	Civil War, Rebecca Emily
Augustus Lutheran Church		September 3, 1947	Main St. (old U.S. 422) in Trappe; 40.20115°N 75.4812°W	Roadside	Religion
Baldwin School		April 11, 2000	701 Montgomery Ave., Bryn Mawr	Roadside	Buildings, Education, Railroads
Bert Bell		November 22, 1997	224-226 Haverford Ave., Narberth; 40.00537°N 75.26103°W	City	Football, Sports
Beth Sholom Synagogue		September 21, 2008	8231 Old York Rd., Elkins Park; 40.0818°N 75.1268°W	City	Buildings, Religion
Betzwood Motion Picture Studio		June 3, 2003	Near Route 363 and Route 422 expressway, Norristown	City	Business & Industry, Invention, Motion Pictures & Television
Bryn Athyn Cathedral		September 10, 1947	Pa. 232 in Bryn Athyn at Cathedral	Roadside	Religion
Bryn Mawr Summer School for Women Workers in Industry		October 13, 2001	Bryn Mawr Campus, Corner of Morris Road and Yarrow Streets; 40.0241°N 75.31388°W	Roadside	African American, Civil Rights, Education, Ethnic & Immigration, Labor, Women
Camp William Penn		May 15, 1999	7322 Sycamore Ave., LaMott; 40.06635°N 75.1423°W	Roadside	African American, Civil War, Military
Charles Thomson		September 10, 1947	SR 3034 (Morris Ave. at Harriton Rd.), NE, of Bryn Mawr (Missing)	Roadside	Ethnic & Immigration, Government & Politics, Government & Politics 18th Century
Crooked Billet		May 1, 1965	Meadowbrook Ave. at Crooked Billet Elem. School in Hatboro	Roadside	American Revolution, Military, Inns & Taverns
Cyrus H. K. Curtis (1850-1933)		November 7, 2005	1250 W Church Rd., Wyncote (SR73); 40.08693°N 75.14942°W	Roadside	Entrepreneurs, Environment, Publishing
Early Grist Mill		May 2, 1955	Pa. 320 at Gulph Mills (Missing)	City	Buildings, Business & Industry, Mills
Early Tavern		September 14, 1972	General Wayne Inn, 625 Montgomery Ave., Narberth	Roadside	Business & Industry, George Washington, Inns & Taverns, William Penn
Edward Hector		September 19, 1967	Intersection SR 3016 & 3013 (Fayette & Hector Sts.), Conshohocken; 40.07328°N 75.30668°W	Roadside	African American, American Revolution, Military
Falkner Swamp Reformed Church		October 9, 1960	Swamp Pike (county highway, Limerick to Gilbertsville), .5 mile SE of New Hanover; 40.2961°N 75.58013°W	Roadside	Buildings, Ethnic & Immigration, Religion
First Iron Bridge		May 21, 1953	SE corner, High & York Sts., Pottstown; 40.24588°N 75.65263°W	City	Bridges, Iron, Railroads, Transportation
Frank N.D. Buchman		October 19, 1991	772 Main St. (Pa. 29), Pennsburg	Roadside	Professions & Vocations, Religion
Frederick A. C. Muhlenberg (1750-1801)		April 12, 2008	151 W Main St., Trappe	Roadside	Government & Politics, Government & Politics 18th Century, Religion
Gen. Andrew Porter		March 11, 1949	W. Main & Selma Sts., Norristown; 40.12258°N 75.36063°W	Roadside	American Revolution, Military
Graeme Park		n/a	At site, SR 2038 (County Line Road), 1 mile NW of Pa. 611, Hatboro (Missing)	Roadside	Environment, Government & Politics 18th Century
Gulph Mills Encampment		May 2, 1955	Pa. 320 near intersection SR 3030 at Gulph Mills (Missing)	City	American Revolution, Military
Gulph Mills Village		November 9, 1982	Intersection Pa. 320 & SR 3039 (Gulph Rd.), Gulph Mills; 40.06293°N 75.34125°W	City	Buildings, Houses & Homesteads, Inns & Taverns
Harold F. Pitcairn		April 29, 1972	Buck & Paper Mill Rds., Bryn Athyn; 40.132°N 75.05835°W	Roadside	Invention, Medicine & Science, Professions & Vocations, Transportation
Harriton		June 12, 1963	SR 3034 (Morris Ave. at Harriton Rd.), NE of Bryn Mawr	City	Government & Politics, Government & Politics 18th Century, Houses & Homesteads
Hope Lodge		February 16, 1966	At site, Old Bethlehem Pike (SR 2018), Fort Washington; 40.12495°N 75.21753°W	Roadside	Buildings, Houses & Homesteads
James A. Bland		September 26, 1961	Pa. 23 (Conshohocken State Rd.), Bala Cynwyd	City	African American, Music & Theater, Performers
John Dickinson		September 23, 2001	Montgomery Avenue & Meetinghouse Lane, Merion (MISSING)	Roadside	American Revolution, Government & Politics 18th Century, Military
John F. Hartranft		May 6, 1947	Sanatoga Rd., SW of Fagleysville; 40.27137°N 75.57325°W	Roadside	Civil War, Government & Politics, Government & Politics 19th Century, Governors, Military
John F. Hartranft		September 4, 1947	SR 4031 (High St., old U.S. 422), Sanatoga (Missing)	Roadside	Civil War, Government & Politics, Government & Politics 19th Century, Governors, Military
Keith House		1947	At Graeme Park, County Line Rd., 1 mile NW of Pa. 611, Hatboro; 40.21854°N 75.15049°W	Roadside	Government & Politics, Government & Politics 18th Century, Houses & Homesteads
Lafayette		October 7, 1980	801 Ridge Pike, Barren Hill, E of Conshohocken; 40.7823°N 75.24968°W	Roadside	American Revolution, Military
Lucretia C. Mott		May 1, 1974	Pa. 611 N of Cheltenham Ave., Elkins Park; 40.06442°N 75.13548°W	Roadside	Civil Rights, Government & Politics, Government & Politics 19th Century, Religion, Underground Railroad, Women
Merion Friends Meeting		September 15, 1967	651 Montgomery Ave., Narberth; 40.0093°N 75.25418°W	City	Buildings, Ethnic & Immigration, Religion, William Penn
Mill Grove		October 9, 1970	Entrance to Audubon Wildlife Sanctuary, Audubon & Pawlings Rds. (SR 4041 & 4004), Audubon; 40.12337°N 75.43708°W	Roadside	Artists, Buildings, Environment, Mansions & Manors, Writers
Muhlenberg Home		October 3, 1963	E. 7th Ave., .3 mile from Main St. (old U.S. 422), Trappe (Missing); 40.1963°N 75.46987°W	Roadside	Education, Government & Politics, Government & Politics 18th Century
Muhlenberg House		April 28, 1960	201 Main St. (old U.S. 422), Trappe	City	American Revolution, Religion
New Goschenhoppen Reformed Church		August 26, 1952	SR 1042 (Church Rd.), W of East Greenville	Roadside	Buildings, Religion
New Hanover Lutheran Church		September 8, 1950	Swamp Pike (county highway), at Lutheran Rd., near Gilbertsville Golf Course, .2 mile SE of New Hanover; 40.29793°N 75.58173°W	Roadside	Buildings, Ethnic & Immigration, Religion
Pennsylvania School of Horticulture for Women, The		September 20, 2002	580 Meetinghouse Road, Ambler	Roadside	Agriculture, Education, Military, Women
Pennypacker's Mill & Mansion		September 24, 1946	At site, Skippack Pike (PA 73) and Haldeman Rd., Schwenksville; 40.25267°N 75.45862°W	Roadside	George Washington, Government & Politics, Government & Politics 18th Century, Governors
Perkiomen Bridge		September 4, 1947	E Main St. / Ridge Pike (SR 4031 / old U.S. 422) at bridge, E end of Collegeville; 40.18428°N 75.44717°W	Roadside	Bridges, Transportation
Philo T. Farnsworth (1906-1971)		September 15, 2006	1260 E Mermaid Lane, Wyndmoor; 40.08318°N 75.18202°W	City	Business & Industry, Invention
Plymouth Friends Meetinghouse		May 15, 1955	Germantown Pike (old U.S. 422) & Butler Pike at Plymouth Meeting; 40.10272°N 75.27882°W	Roadside	African American, American Revolution, Buildings, George Washington, Religion
Porter Home		September 3, 1947	U.S. 422 at Norristown (Missing)	Roadside	American Revolution, Government & Politics 19th Century, Military
Pottsgrove Manor		September 25, 2000	At site, 100 W. King St., Pottstown; 40.24788°N 75.65995°W	Roadside	Buildings, Business & Industry, Iron, Mansions & Manors
Rittenhouse Farm		September 3, 1947	Pa. 363 E of Eagleville, intersection SR 3009 (Ridge Pike) & 3002 (Trooper Rd.), Norristown; 40.14187°N 75.38915°W	Roadside	Medicine & Science, Professions & Vocations
Rittenhouse Farm		March 14, 1949	Germantown Pike (former U.S. 422) at Valley Forge Medical Ctr., 6 miles SE of Collegeville (Missing)	Roadside	Medicine & Science, Professions & Vocations
Selma		March 15, 1949	1301 W. Airy St., Norristown; 40.12328°N 75.36°W	Roadside	American Revolution, Military
St. Paul's Episcopal Church		October 1, 1992	Old York Rd. (PA 611) at Asbourne Rd., Elkins Park; 40.07148°N 75.13347°W	Roadside	Buildings, Civil War, Religion
St. Peter's Church		November 9, 1963	Church Rd., off Germantown Pike (old U.S. 422) 5 miles E of Norristown; 40.08287°N 75.25095°W	Roadside	American Revolution, Buildings, Religion
Thomas Rowland & Sons Shovel Works		October 21, 2006	300 Ashbourne Rd., Cheltenham	Roadside	Business & Industry, Mills
Timothy Matlack		June 4, 1969	Pawlings Rd. (SR 4004) near Audubon Rd. (SR 4041) at Audubon; 40.122°N 75.43975°W	Roadside	American Revolution, Government & Politics, Government & Politics 18th Century, Religion
Village of La Mott		June 1973	PA 309 (Cheltenham Ave.) just NW of Pa. 611	Roadside	African American, Cities & Towns, Civil War, Military, William Penn
Wall House (The Ivy)		November 21, 1982	Wall Park Dr. & Church Rd., Elkins Park	Roadside	Houses & Homesteads, Religion, William Penn
Whitemarsh		December 22, 1947	SR 2027 (Pennsylvania Ave.) just E of Pa. 309, SE of Fort Washington; 40.12425°N 75.19247°W	Roadside	American Revolution, George Washington, Houses & Homesteads, Military
William B. T. Trego (1858-1909)		September 20, 2008	509 E Montgomery Ave., North Wales; 40.21345°N 75.2748°W	City	Artists, Military
Winfield S. Hancock		September 11, 1947	Pa. 309 S of Montgomeryville	Roadside	Civil War, Military
Woodrow Wilson		November 1, 1958	New Gulph Rd. at entrance to college, near Caversham Rd., Bryn Mawr; 40.0282°N 75.31242°W	City	Education, Government & Politics, Government & Politics 19th Century, Government & Politics 20th Century

== See also ==
- List of Pennsylvania state historical markers
- National Register of Historic Places listings in Montgomery County, Pennsylvania
