= Arcola, Pennsylvania =

Unincorporated community in Pennsylvania, US

- Unincorporated community
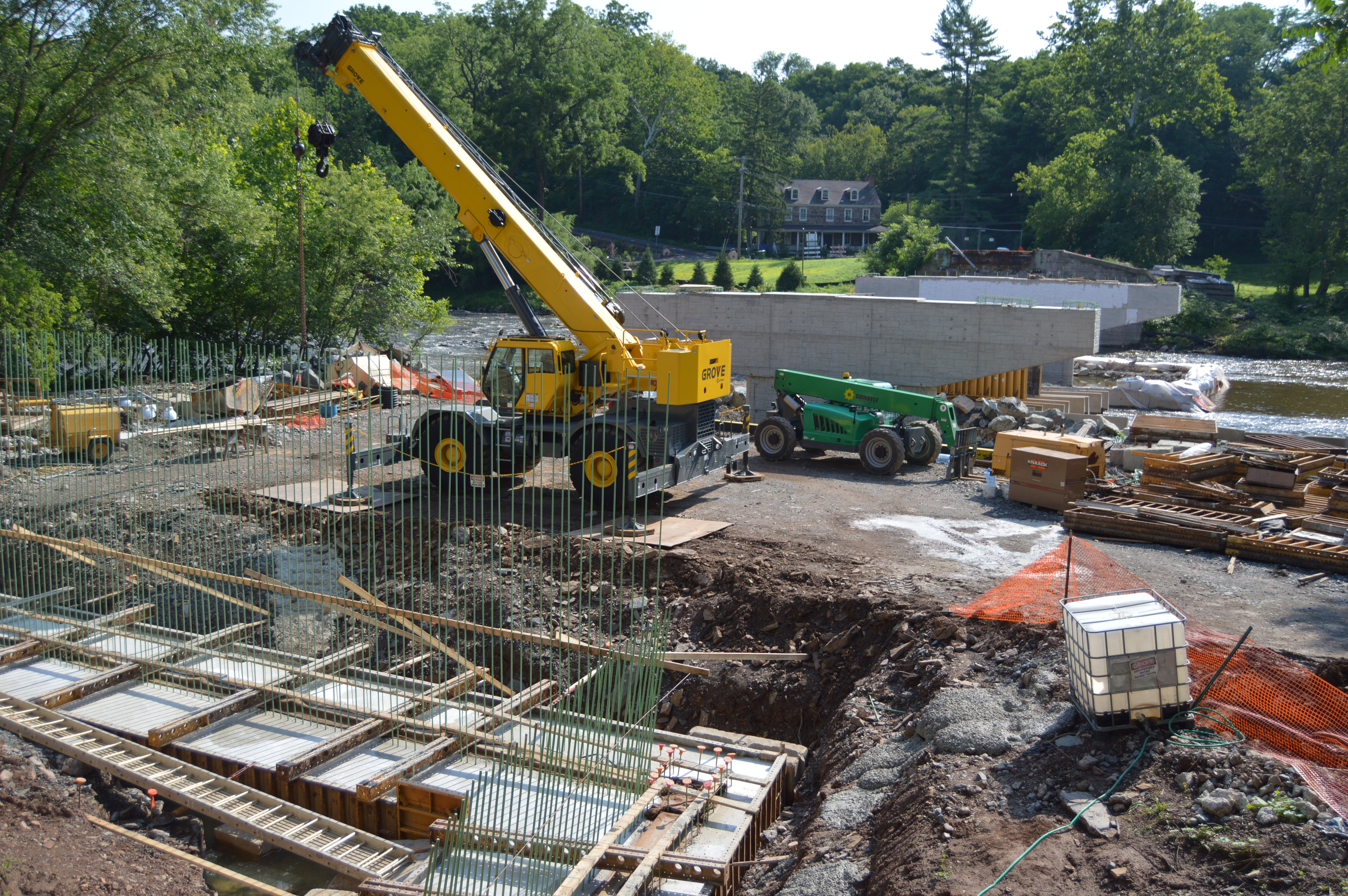

- Location within Pennsylvania
- Coordinates: 40°09′09″N 75°27′24″W
- Country: United States
- State: Pennsylvania
- County: Montgomery
- Elevation: 102 ft (31 m)
- Time zone: UTC-5 (Eastern (EST))
  - Summer (DST): UTC-4 (EDT)
- Area code: 610
- GNIS feature ID: 1168374

Arcola is an unincorporated community in Upper Providence Township, Montgomery County, Pennsylvania. It is located on Perkiomen Creek, 6.5 miles (10.5 km) west-northwest of Norristown.
