= Green Lane Park =

County park in Pennsylvania

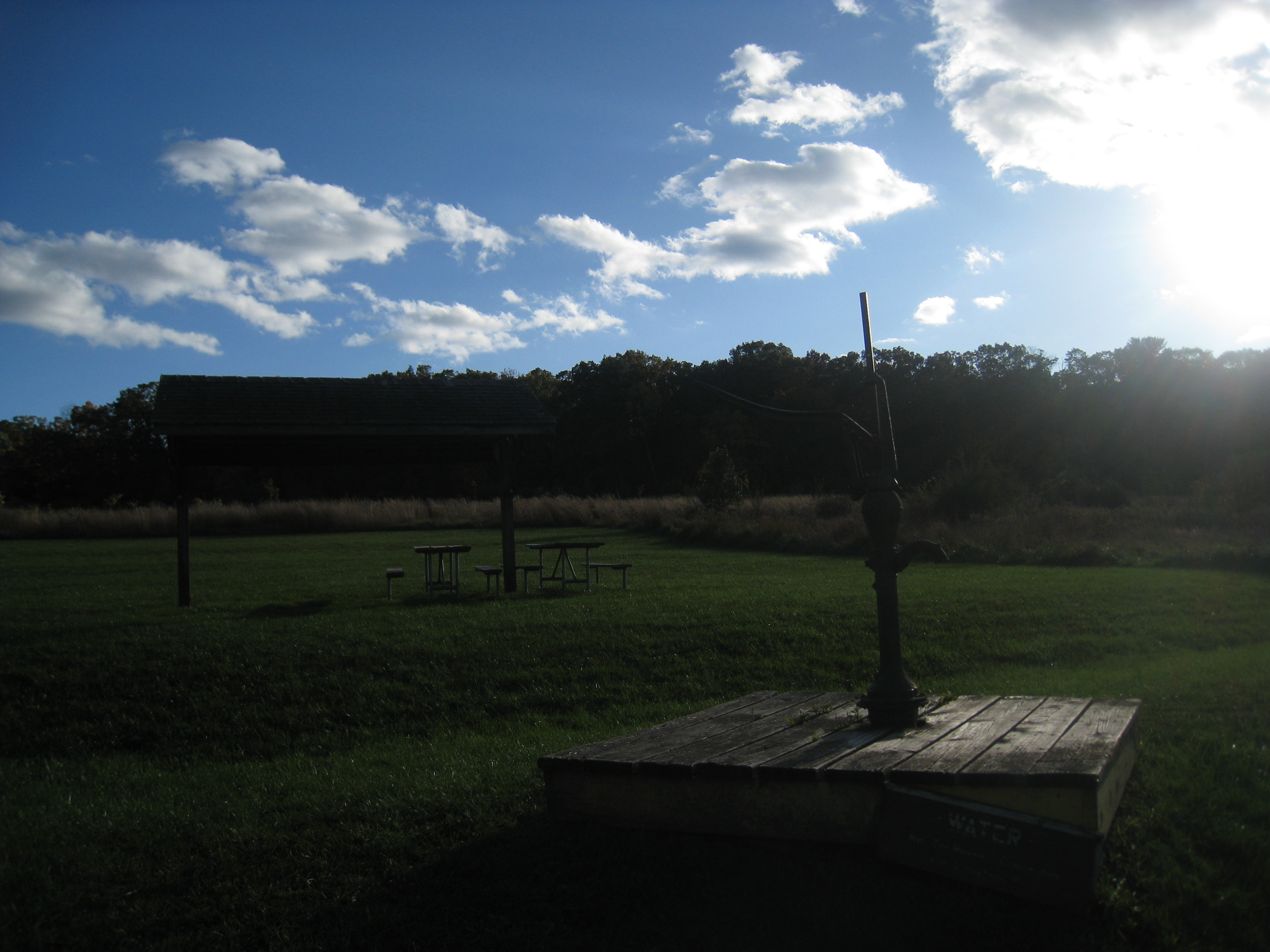
- Spigot near the Green Lane Red Trail parking lot
- Interactive map of Green Lane Park
- Type: County park
- Location: Green Lane, Montgomery County, Pennsylvania, U.S.
- Coordinates: 40°19′55″N 75°28′58″W
- Area: 3,400 acres (1,400 ha)
- Created: 1998
- Operator: Montgomery County Council
- Open: 6 a.m. until sunset

Green Lane Park is a county park located in northwestern Montgomery County, Pennsylvania.

Most of the park's many recreational areas, spanning over 3,000 acres (1,200 ha), are open from 6 a.m. until sunset. Green Lane Park has playgrounds, campgrounds, disc golf, orienteering, ice skating, and over 20 miles (32 km) of trails available for equestrians, cyclists, hikers, and x-c skiers alike.

== History ==
In 1939, 425 acres (172 ha) were dedicated as the Upper Perkiomen Valley Park by the Montgomery County Commissioners. Previously, in 1929, planning for a dam built across Perkiomen Creek began, although its actual construction occurred from 1954 to 1957. This area, called the Green Lane Reservoir, was opened for public recreational use in 1959 by the Philadelphia Suburban Water Company. Recreational easement rights were later turned over to Montgomery County, which led to the 1983 creation of Green Lane Reservoir Park. The two parks were later merged into Green Lane Park in 1998.

== Events ==
- The Upper Perkiomen Bird & Wildlife Festival, an annual event promoting education on conservation and nature, was first held in 2012 and has occurred every year since. It is estimated that over 3,000 people attend each year.
- June through August, a summer concert series takes place in the Green Lane Park Band Shell. A variety of local musicians are invited to perform, including original and tribute acts.
- Every October, the Haunted Campground Hayride event is hosted in the park in celebration of Halloween.

== Gallery ==
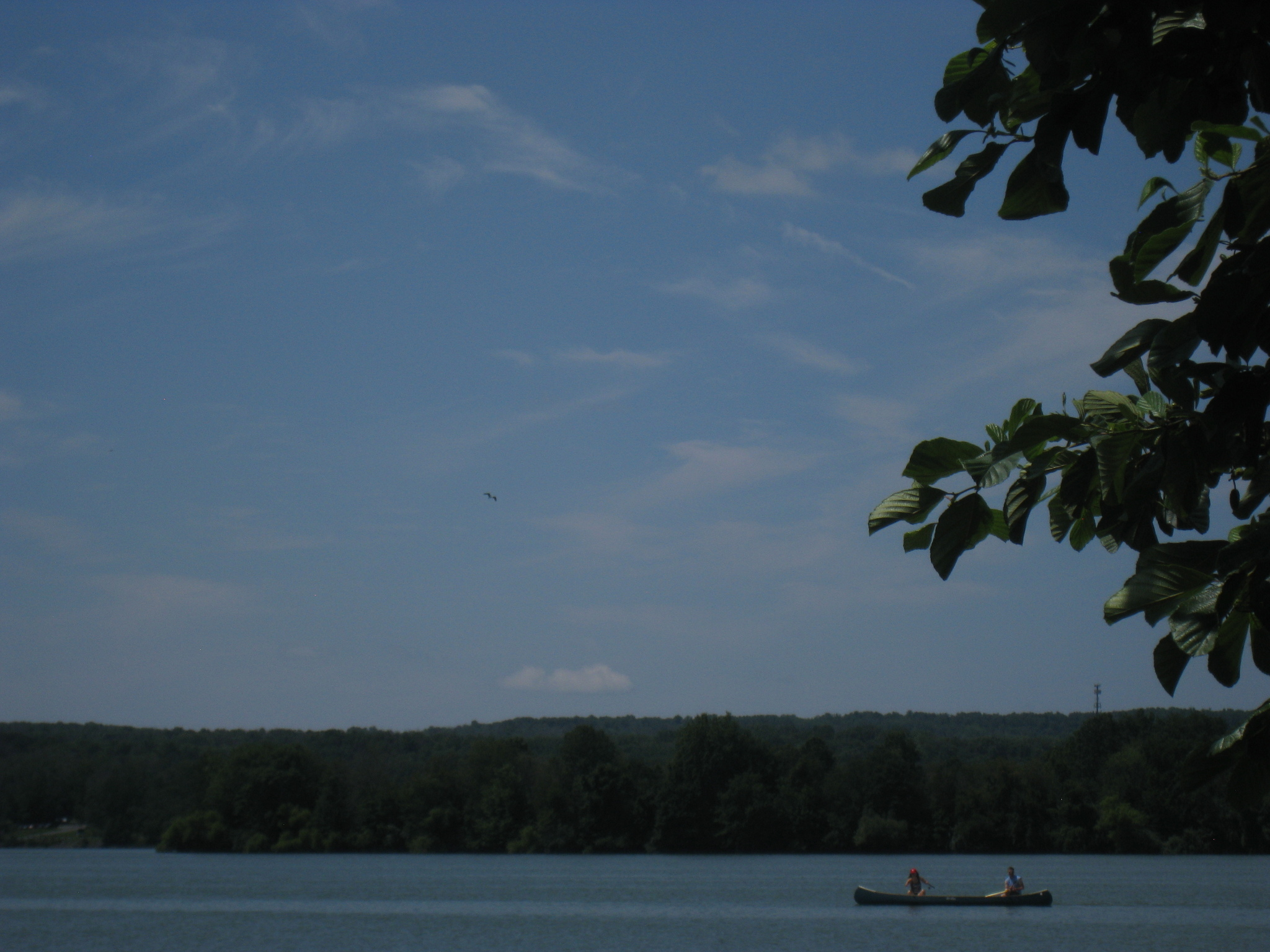
View of canoers in and an osprey over a body of water in the park

== See also ==
- List of parks in Pennsylvania
