= Perkiomen Bridge Hotel =

- U.S. National Register of Historic Places
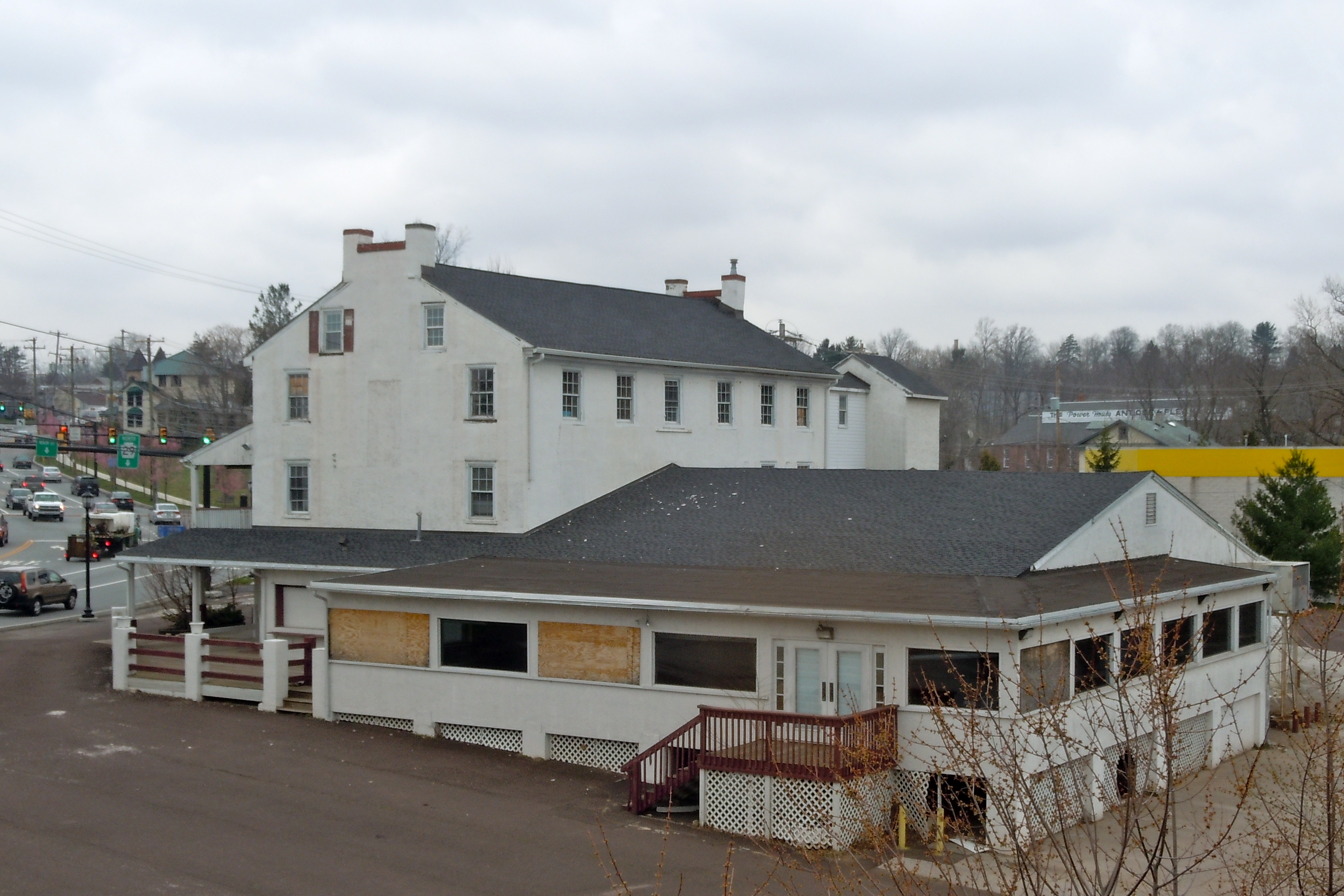
- Perkiomen Bridge Hotel, April 2011

- Location within Pennsylvania Location within the United States
- Location: Main St. and Rt. 29, Collegeville, Pennsylvania
- Coordinates: 40°11′5″N 75°26′59″W
- Area: 1 acre (0.40 ha)
- Built: 1706, c. 1800, c. 1930
- NRHP reference No.: 85000037
- Added to NRHP: January 3, 1985

The Perkiomen Bridge Hotel, also known as Lane's Hotel, is a historic, American hotel complex that is located adjacent to the Perkiomen Bridge in Collegeville, Montgomery County, Pennsylvania.

It was added to the National Register of Historic Places in 1985.

== History and architectural features ==
The original building was built circa 1706 (some sources say 1689), with later expansions undertaken during the eighteenth, nineteenth, and twentieth centuries. It consists of a three-story, six-bay, gable-roofed, stuccoed, brownstone building that was erected circa 1800 with two-story porches and a low, gable-roofed wing that is likely the oldest portion of the structure. Attached to this is a low, one-story, kitchen wing and enclosed porch that dates to circa 1930. The building was auctioned in 2010.
