= Perkiomen Bridge =

- U.S. National Register of Historic Places
- Pennsylvania Historical Marker
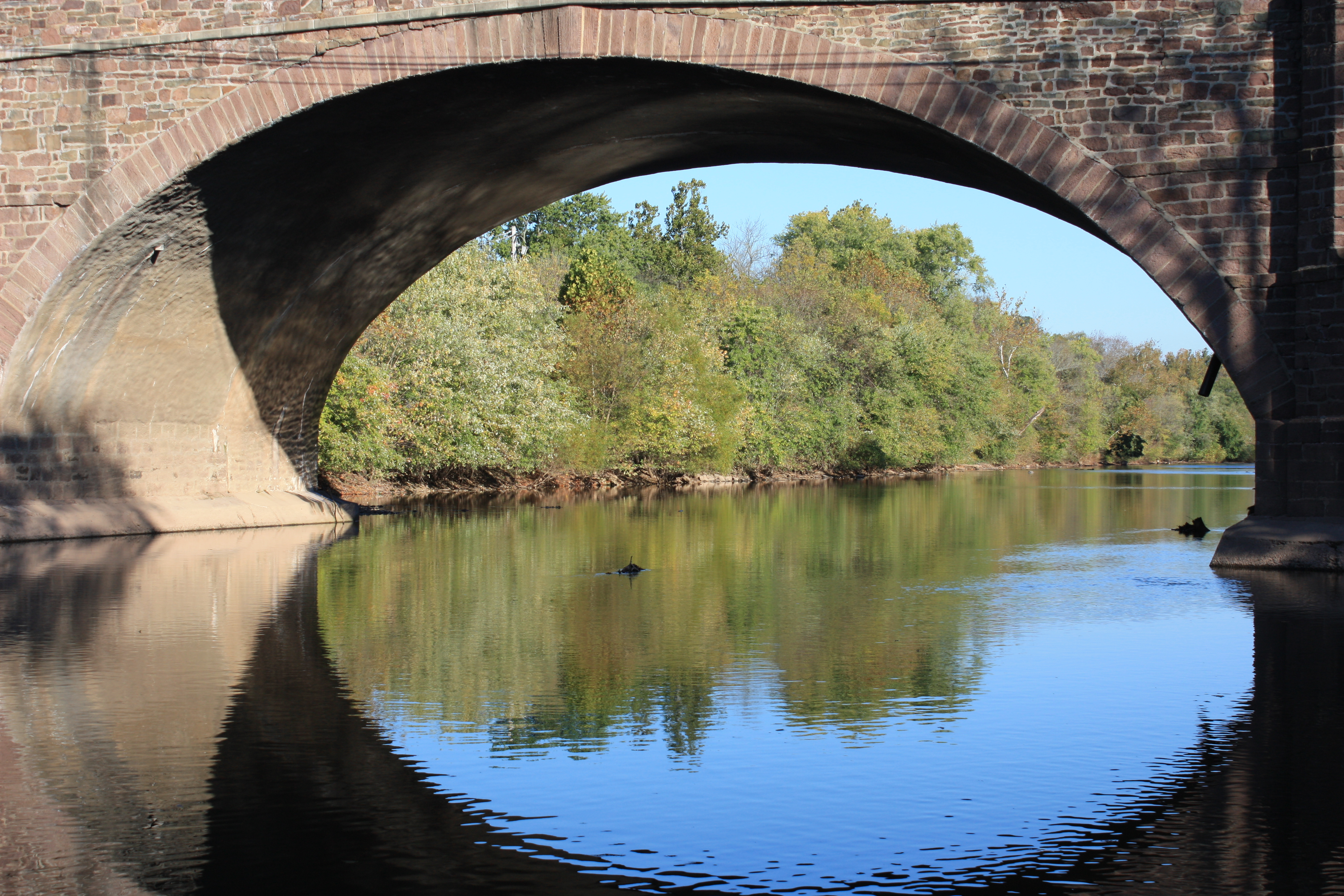

- Location within Pennsylvania Location within the United States
- Nearest city: Collegeville, Pennsylvania
- Coordinates: 40°11′3″N 75°26′54″W
- Area: less than one acre
- Built: 1799
- Architect: Lewis, John; Et al.
- Architectural style: Multi-span stone arch
- MPS: Highway Bridges Owned by the Commonwealth of Pennsylvania, Department of Transportation TR
- NRHP reference No.: 88000826

Significant dates
- Added to NRHP: June 22, 1988
- Designated PHMC: September 04, 1947

The Perkiomen Bridge, originally built 1798-99 and widened in 1928, is one of the oldest stone arch bridges in the United States still in use. It crosses Perkiomen Creek near Collegeville, Pennsylvania. The bridge's six semi-circular arches cover a total of over 300 feet (91 m). The longest arch spans 76 feet (23 m). Its decorative piers and belt courses are unusual for a bridge this old. A lottery financed $20,000 of the original construction. The bridge carried the main road from Philadelphia to Reading, known at various times as the Manatawny Pike, Germantown Pike, the Philadelphia-Reading Pike, and US 422. Since the construction of the US 422 bypass, the road has been known as Ridge Pike or Old US 422.

== Architecture ==
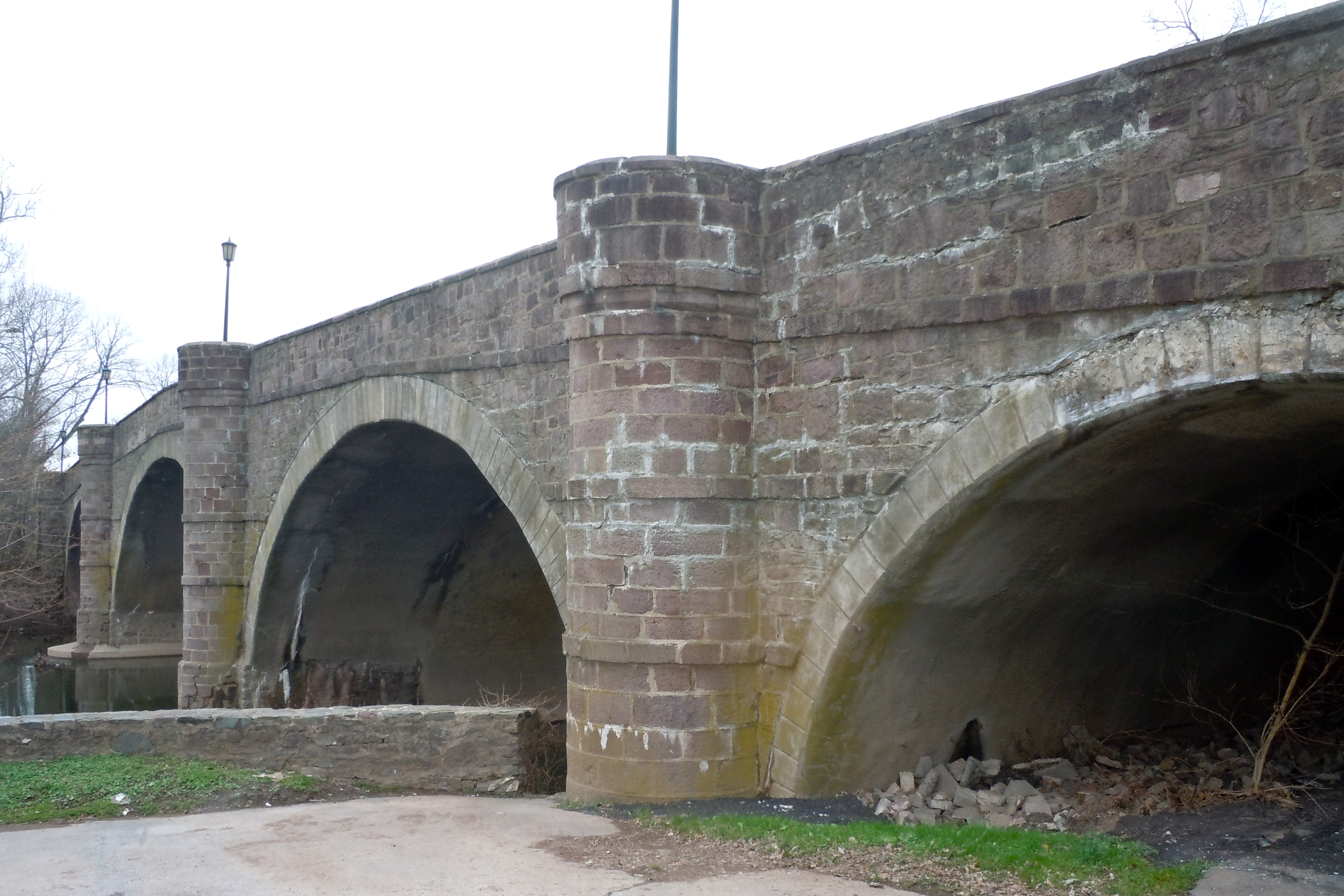
North side of the bridge with rounded columns

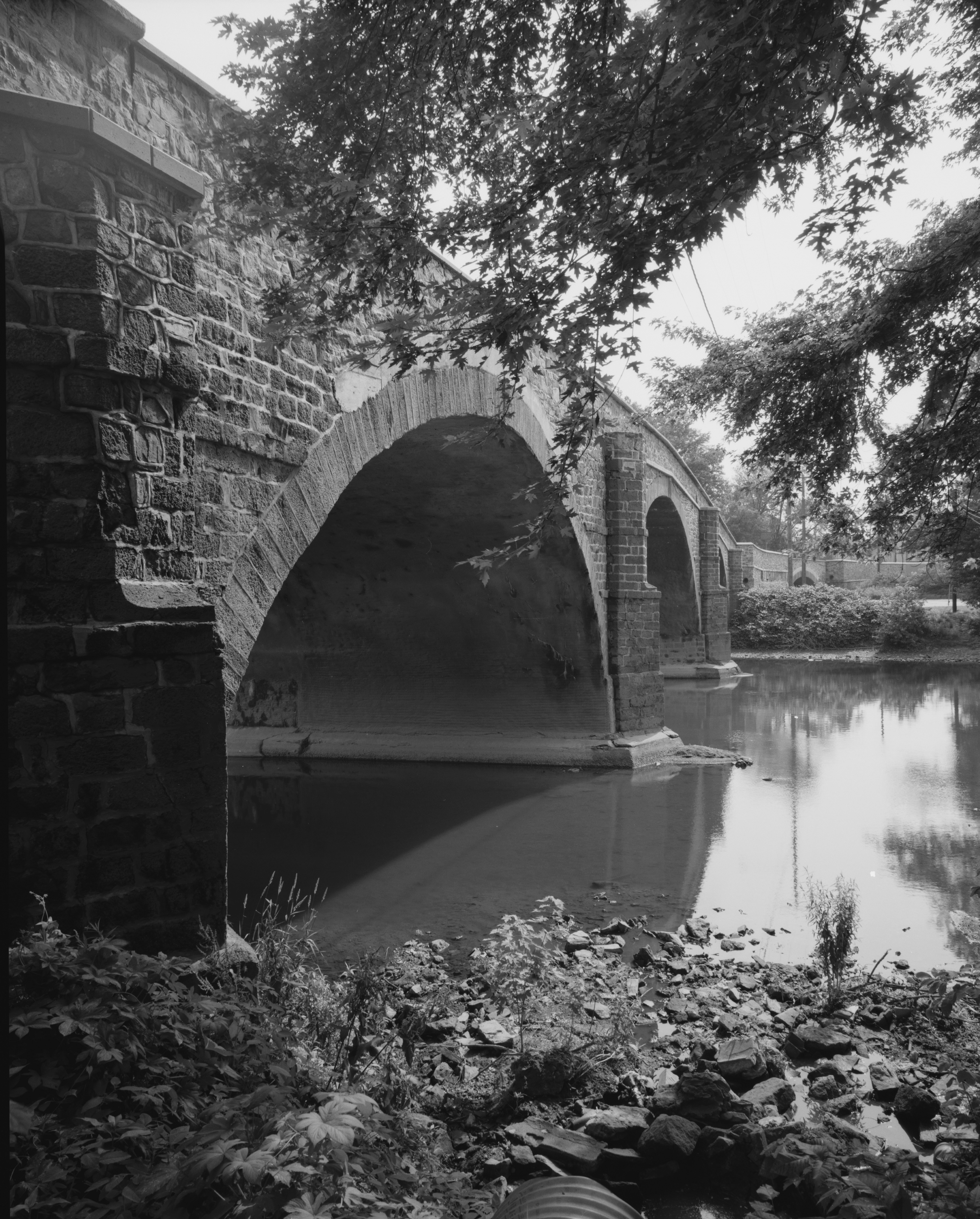
South side of the bridge with shorter angular columns

The creek is about 150 feet (46 m) wide and runs north and south near Collegeville. The road, however, runs northwest to southeast and the bridge crosses perpendicular to the creek causing a sharp turn in the road on the east side of the bridge, and a more gradual bend on the west side. As designed by John Lewis the bridge was 27 feet (8.2 m) wide and 453 feet (138 m) long including the approaches. Five arches cross the creek with the center arch 76 feet (23 m) long, and the arches next to it 61 feet (19 m) long. The outside arches are 30 feet (9.1 m) long. Supporting the eastern approach is a sixth arch, 56 feet (17 m) long, which is about 100 feet (30 m) east of the creek.

The bridge is constructed of cut stones, but they are only laid in regular courses on the spandrels and on the top of the parapet.

The bridge was widened in 1928 by removing all the stone facing on the north side of the bridge, extending the arches 15 feet (4.6 m) north with concrete rather than stone, and resetting the facing. This expansion added a third lane of traffic and a sidewalk on the north side. Rounded columns supporting pedestrian viewing bays were added on the north side of the piers. Shorter angular columns were added on the south side of the bridge.

== History ==
The area on the "Pahkehoma" Creek was purchased by William Penn from the Lenni Lenape tribe in 1684 and eventually sold to Thomas Ruyard of London. In 1699 Edward Lane bought the land from Ruyard, and the purchase was confirmed by Penn in 1701. About 1706 the first section of the Perkiomen Bridge Hotel was built on the west bank of the creek, just to the north of the current bridge site, then known as Phillips Ford. In 1728 the Lenni Lenape released their claim on land in the area for "two guns, six coats, six blankets, six duffel match coats, and four kettles," in effect selling the land again.

A second hotel was built in the area by 1770, to accommodate the traffic between Philadelphia and Reading. Several wooden bridges, including a pontoon bridge, were built across the ford before 1797, but they were all destroyed within a few years by springtime flooding.

The Pennsylvania Legislature approved a lottery in 1797 to raise funds for the bridge, eventually raising $20,000. The bridge was completed in 1799 at a cost of $60,000, opening on November 2.

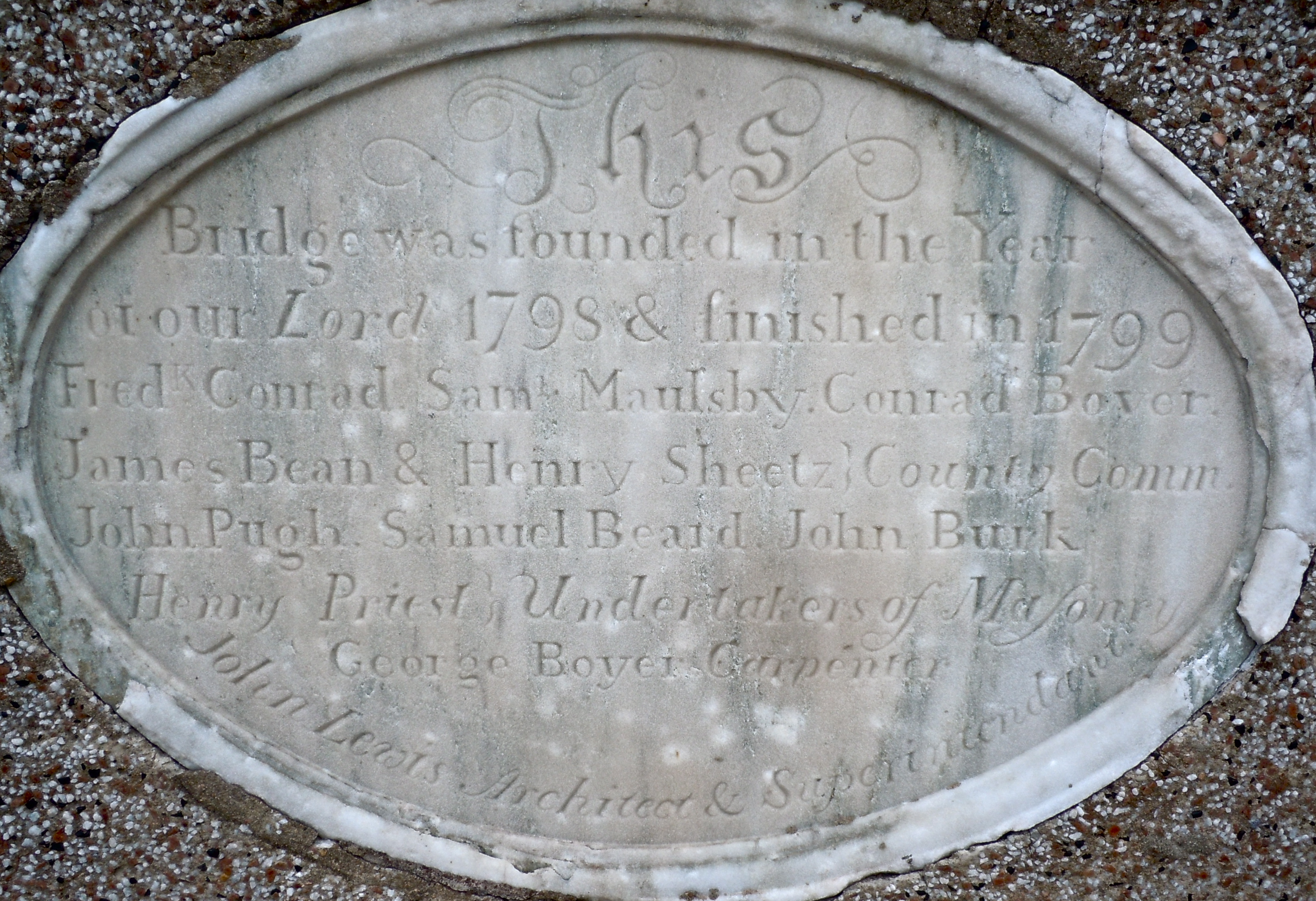
The original dedication plaque on the bridge reads:

This
Bridge was founded in the Year

of our Lord 1798 & finished in 1799
Fredk Conrad Saml Maulsby Conrad Boyer
James Bean & Henry Sheetz County Comm.
John Pugh Samuel Beard John Burk
Henry Priest Undertakers of Masonry
George Boyer Carpenter
John Lewis Architect and Superintendent

The bridge was not completely paid for, so tolls were collected for five years after its construction. Increased road traffic followed the completion of the bridge, and with the start of regular stage coach service between Philadelphia and Reading, the hotel next to the bridge became an overnight stop marking the halfway point of the trip. Turnpikes were created from Germantown to the east end of the bridge in 1804, and from the western end of the bridge to Reading about 1816, but the trip across the bridge remained toll-free until 1867. In that year a toll booth was constructed on the western end of the bridge, and outraged residents burned it down before any tolls could be collected. In 1872 a toll booth was erected on the eastern end. This time residents obtained a court order prohibiting the collection of tolls within a mile of the bridge, then they burned down the toll booth.

Trolley tracks were laid on the south side of the bridge in 1896, eventually connecting Norristown to the south with Trappe on the north. A historical society sued to keep the tracks off the bridge, but the trolley company built the tracks without permission, presenting the court with a fait accompli. The trolleys ran until 1933.

To avoid the necessity of curved approaches, the American Automobile Association lobbied for the removal of the old bridge in 1938, to be replaced by a steel and concrete bridge. No major changes to the bridge occurred however and in the 1980s the new routing of US 422 removed much of the heavy traffic from the bridge.

A Pennsylvania Historical and Museum Commission marker was erected by the bridge in 1947 and the bridge was listed on the National Register of Historic Places in 1988. The Perkiomen Bridge Hotel adjacent to the bridge was listed separately on the National Register of Historic Places.

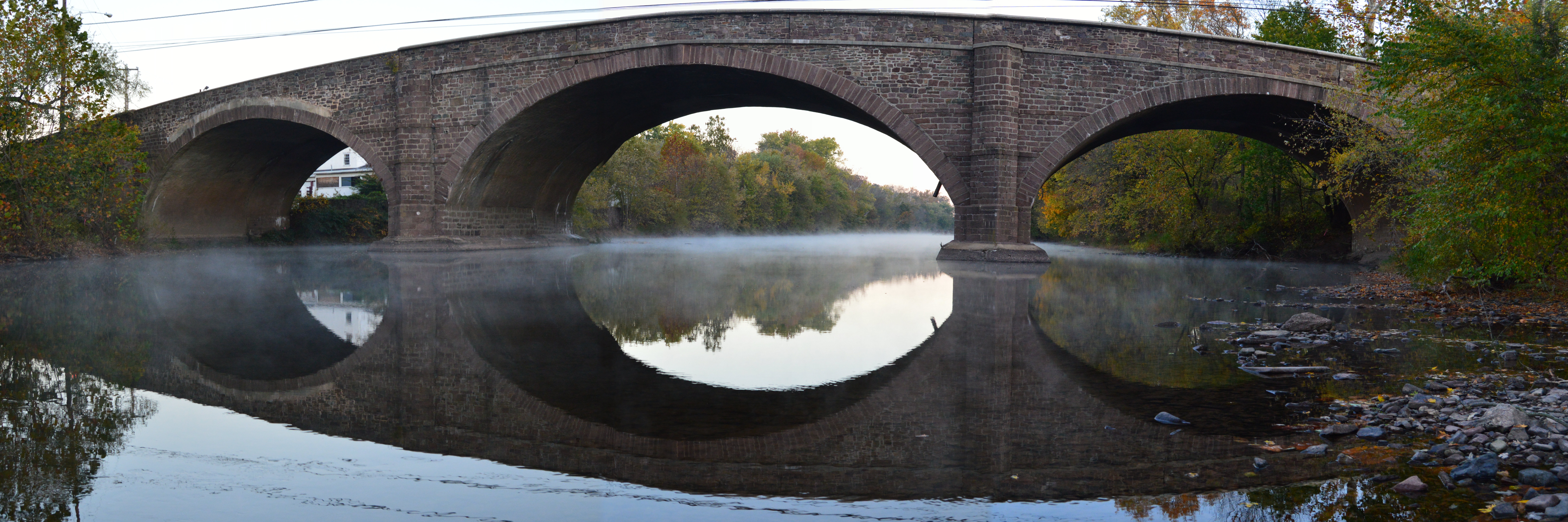
Morning mist

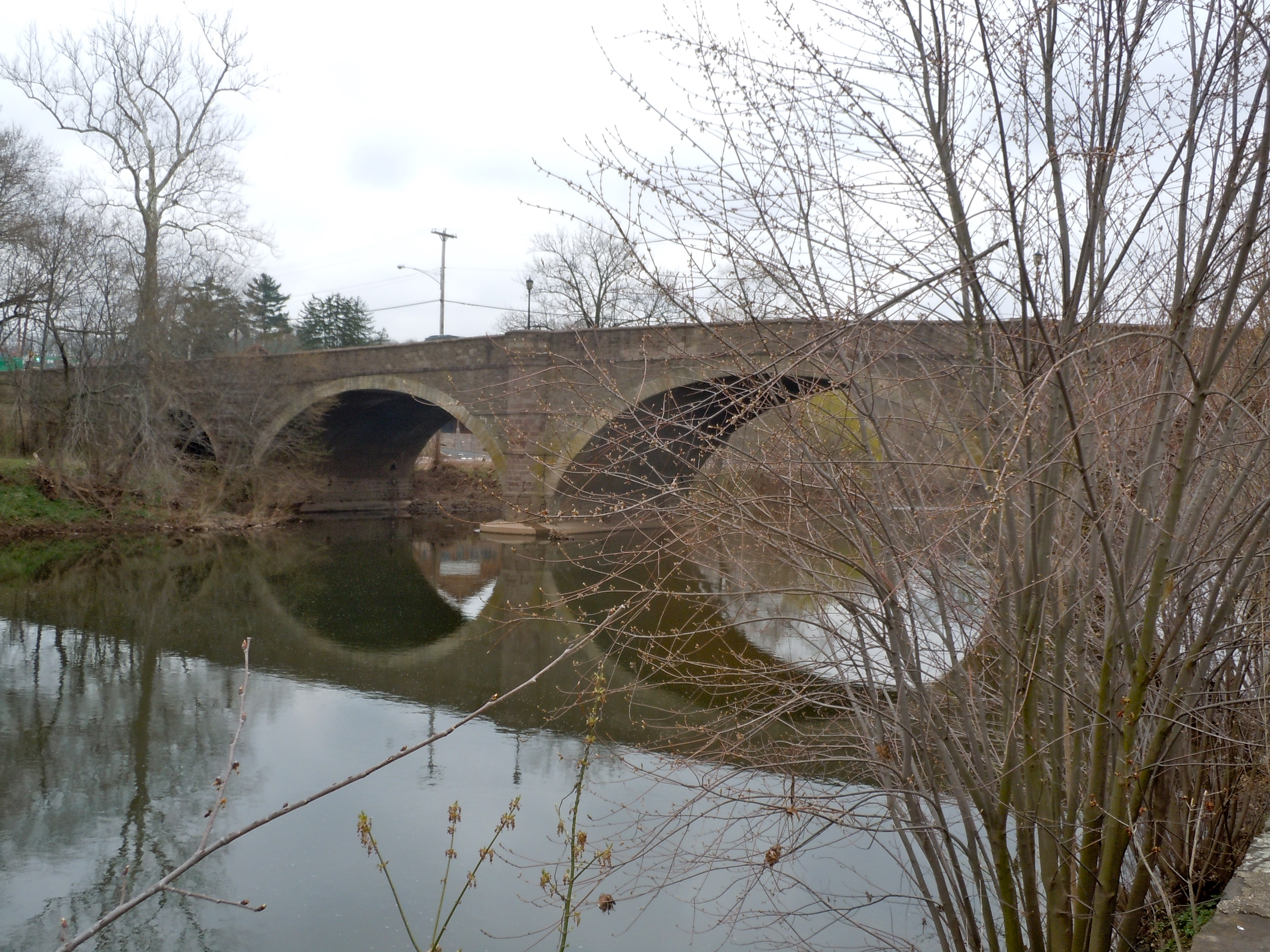
Bridge in 2011

== See also ==
- Frankford Avenue Bridge
- List of bridges documented by the Historic American Engineering Record in Pennsylvania
- List of Pennsylvania state historical markers in Montgomery County
- List of bridges on the National Register of Historic Places in Pennsylvania
- National Register of Historic Places listings in Montgomery County, Pennsylvania

== Sources ==
- Historic American Engineering Record (HAER) No. PA-310, "Perkiomen Stone Arch Bridge", 10 photos, 5 data pages
- PennDOT District 6–0 (1982). National Register of Historic Places Registration: Pennsylvania MPS Perkiomen Bridge. National Archives and Records Administration. (Downloading may be slow.)
- George E. Thomas (1984). National Register of Historic Places Registration: Pennsylvania SP Perikomen Bridge Hotel. National Archives and Records Administration. (Downloading may be slow.)
