= Green Lane, Pennsylvania =

Borough in Pennsylvania, US

Borough of Green Lane
- Borough
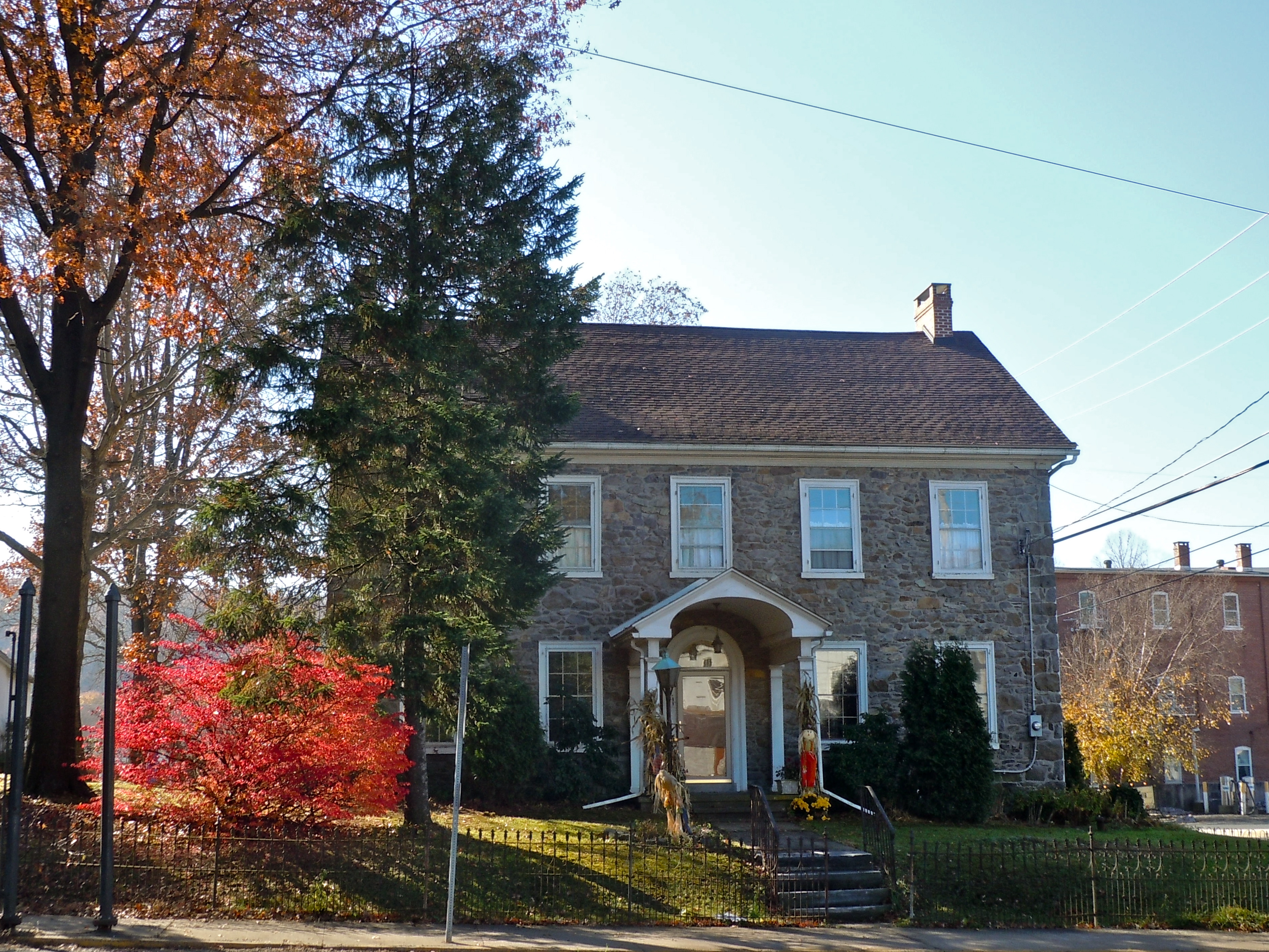
- William and Caroline Schall House on Main Street

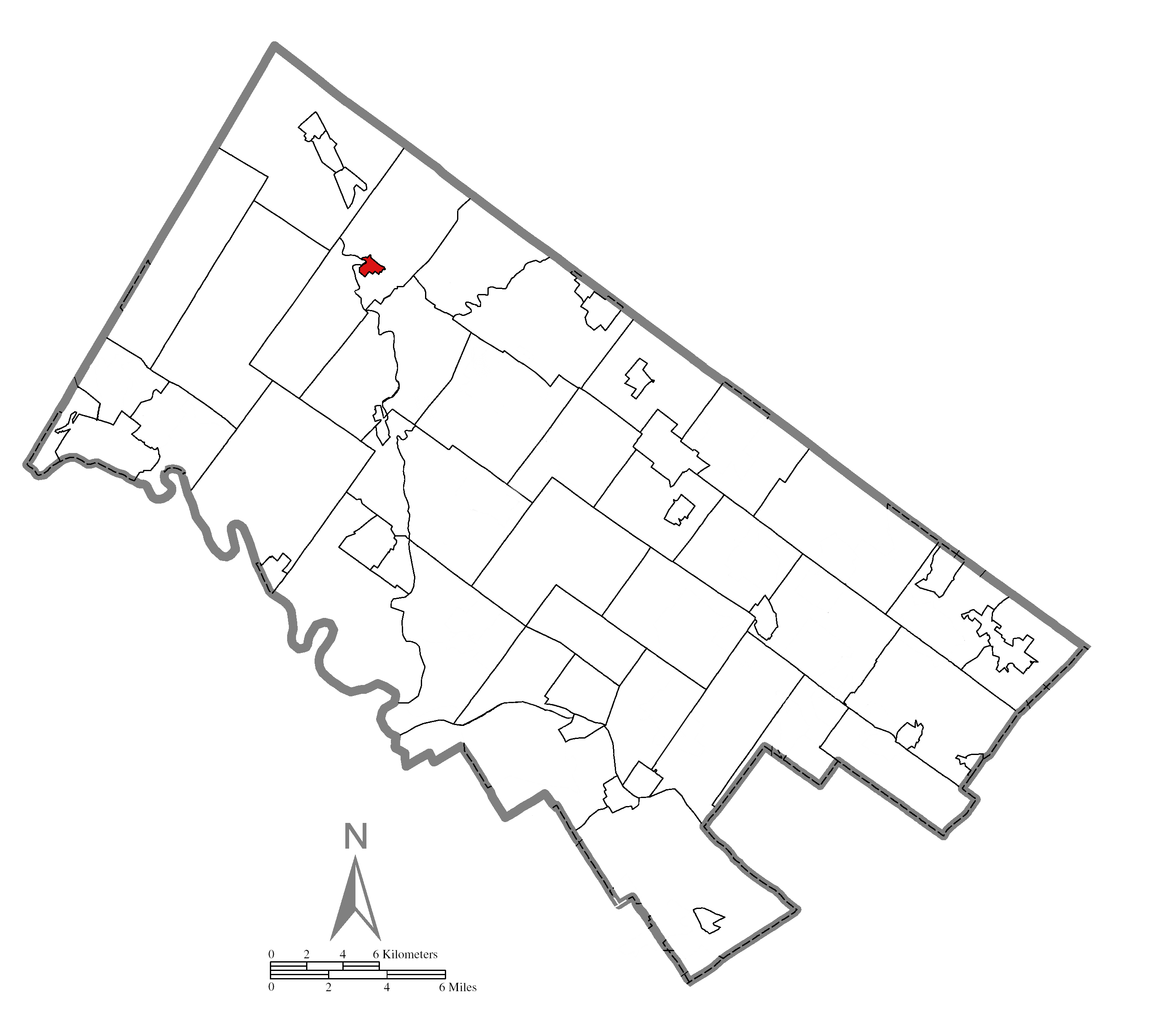
- Location of Green Lane in Montgomery County, Pennsylvania

- Location of Green Lane in Pennsylvania Green Lane (the United States)
- Coordinates: 40°20′14″N 75°28′09″W
- Country: United States
- State: Pennsylvania
- County: Montgomery
- Incorporated: December 10, 1875

Government
  - Type: Council-manager
  - Mayor: Rick Stamper

Area
  - Total: 0.33 sq mi (0.85 km^{2})
  - Land: 0.32 sq mi (0.83 km^{2})
  - Water: 0.012 sq mi (0.03 km^{2})
- Elevation: 239 ft (73 m)

Population (2020)
  - Total: 490
  - Density: 1,536.0/sq mi (593.05/km^{2})
- Time zone: UTC-5 (EST)
  - Summer (DST): UTC-4 (EDT)
- ZIP Code: 18054
- Area codes: 215, 267 & 445
- FIPS code: 42-31088
- School district: Upper Perkiomen School District
- Website: https://greenlaneborough.org/

Green Lane is a borough in Montgomery County, Pennsylvania. The population was 490 at the 2020 census. It is part of the Upper Perkiomen School District.

== History ==
The William and Caroline Schall House was added to the National Register of Historic Places in 2007.

== Geography ==
Green Lane is located at 40°20′14″N 75°28′9″W (40.337224, -75.469300). According to the U.S. Census Bureau, the borough has a total area of 0.3 square miles (0.78 km^{2}), all land.

== Demographics ==
Historical population
Census	Pop.	Note	%±
1880	187		—
1890	237		26.7%
1900	272		14.8%
1910	372		36.8%
1920	332		−10.8%
1930	388		16.9%
1940	478		23.2%
1950	550		15.1%
1960	582		5.8%
1970	543		−6.7%
1980	542		−0.2%
1990	442		−18.5%
2000	584		32.1%
2010	508		−13.0%
2020	490		−3.5%

As of the 2010 census, the borough was 97.4% White, 2.0% Black or African American, 0.4% Native American, and 0.2% Asian. 1.0% of the population were of Hispanic or Latino ancestry.

At the 2000 census there were 584 people, 231 households, and 164 families residing in the borough. The population density was 1,797.3 inhabitants per square mile (693.9/km^{2}). There were 235 housing units at an average density of 723.2 per square mile (279.2/km^{2}). The racial makeup of the borough was 97.43% White, 1.03% African American, 0.17% Native American, and 1.37% from two or more races. Hispanic or Latino of any race were 1.03%.

There were 231 households, 32.0% had children under the age of 18 living with them, 55.0% were married couples living together, 9.1% had a female householder with no husband present, and 28.6% were non-families. 23.8% of households were made up of individuals, and 9.5% were one person aged 65 or older. The average household size was 2.53 and the average family size was 2.97.

In the borough, the population was spread out, with 24.8% under the age of 18, 9.1% from 18 to 24, 32.7% from 25 to 44, 20.7% from 45 to 64, and 12.7% 65 or older. The median age was 36 years. For every 100 females there were 103.5 males. For every 100 females age 18 and over, there were 106.1 males.

The median household income was $49,167 and the median family income was $55,714. Males had a median income of $40,000 versus $30,500 for females. The per capita income for the borough was $21,123. About 4.9% of families and 7.4% of the population were below the poverty line, including 10.9% of those under age 18 and 8.9% of those age 69 or over.

== Politics and government ==
Presidential elections results
Year	Republican	Democratic
2020	55.0% 160	42.6% 124
2016	54.8% 137	40.0% 100
2012	48.7% 108	50.9% 113
2008	47.9% 115	50.0% 120
2004	60.1% 128	39.4% 84
2000	55.3% 146	40.9% 108

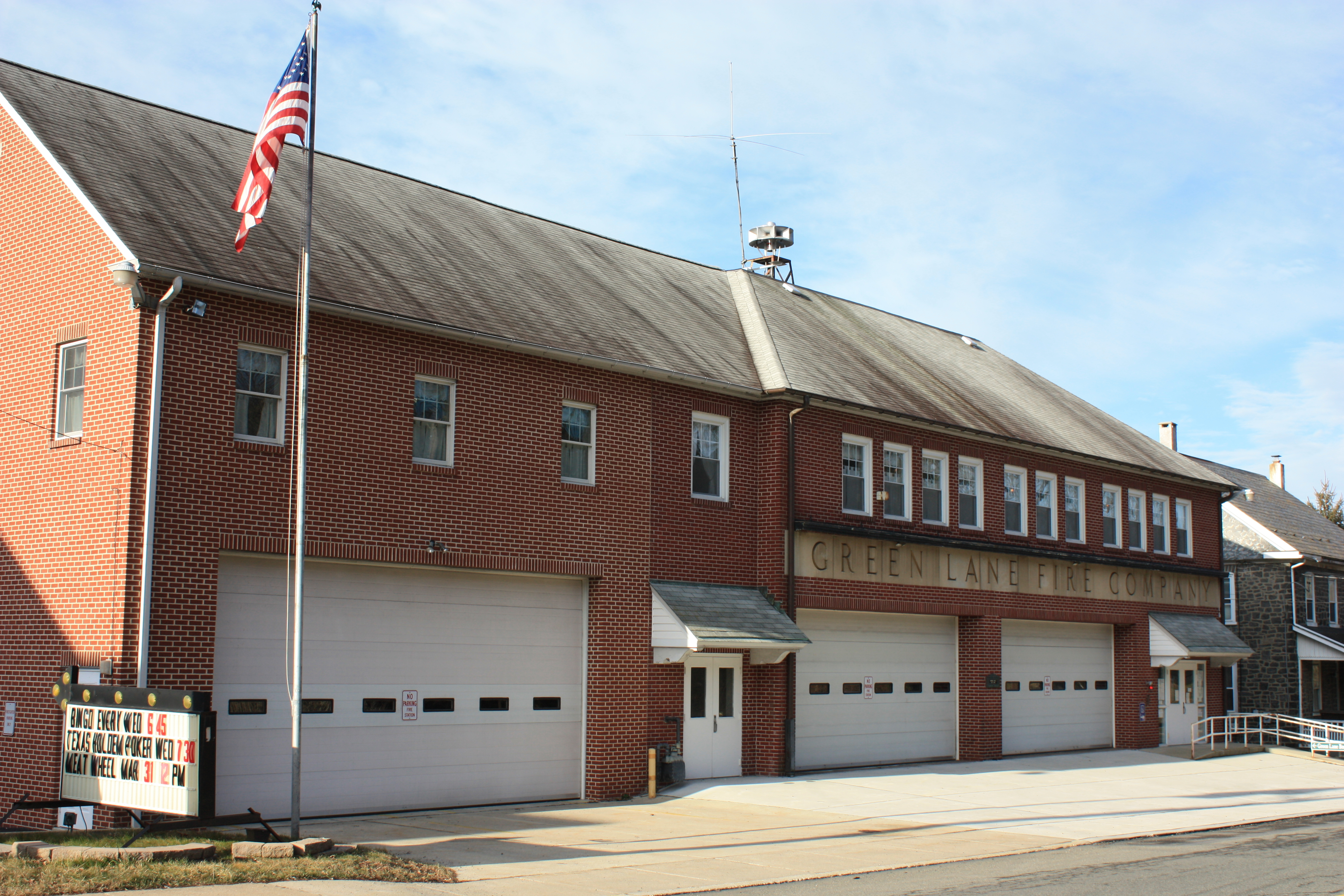
Green Lane Borough Hall

Green Lane has a borough secretary, a mayor and borough council. The borough is part of the Fourth Congressional District (represented by Rep. Madeleine Dean), Pennsylvania's 131 Representative District (represented by Milou Mckenzie) and the 24th State Senate District (represented by Sen. Tracy Pennycuick). Green Lane's current mayor is Rick Stamper.

== Recreation ==
The eponymous Green Lane Park in northwestern Montgomery County offers 3,400 acres (14 km^{2}). The park contains 25 miles (40 km) of paved and dirt trails that are used year-round by equestrians, walkers, bikers, and Nordic skiers. In addition to the trails, visitors may fish and boat. The park staff offers a variety of educational programs. Pennsylvania's Highlands Trail runs through the borough.

== Transportation ==
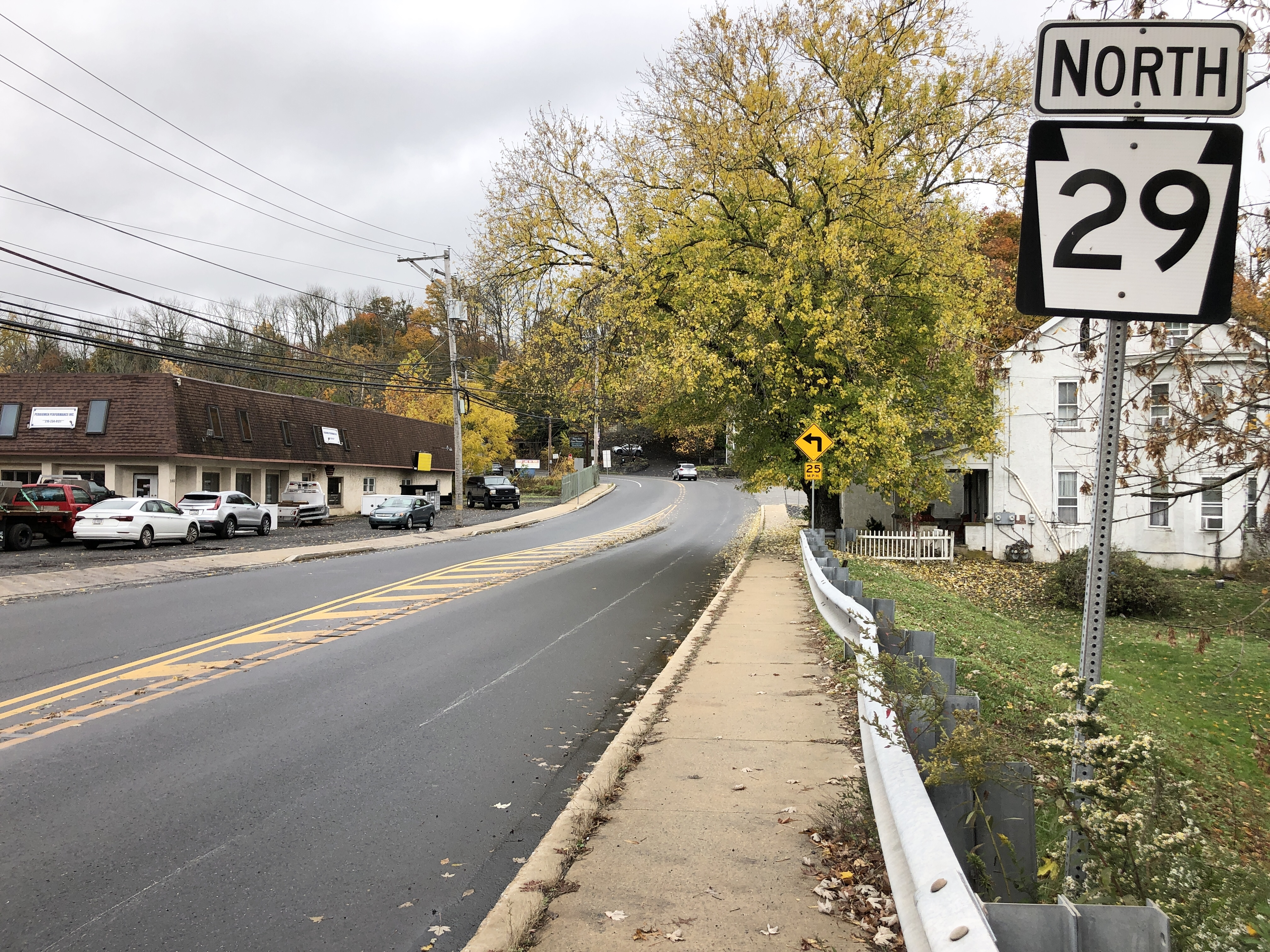
PA 29 northbound in Green Lane

As of 2016 there were 3.10 miles (4.99 km) of public roads in Green Lane, of which 1.28 miles (2.06 km) were maintained by the Pennsylvania Department of Transportation (PennDOT) and 1.82 miles (2.93 km) were maintained by the borough.

Pennsylvania Route 29 and Pennsylvania Route 63 are the numbered highways serving Green Lane. PA 29 traverses the borough on a north–south alignment along Gravel Pike, while PA 63 heads east from PA 29 along Main Street.

== Education ==
It is in the Upper Perkiomen School District.
