= Perkiomen Valley Academy =

Coordinates: 40.31813°N 75.54432°W

The Perkiomen Valley Academy (PVA) day-treatment program is one of several individual treatment and alternative educational centers for adolescents in Montgomery County, Pennsylvania. The program serves twelve- to eighteen-year-old students from the eight school districts located in western Montgomery County.

== Origin ==
Originally established in 1976 as an alternative to institutionalization for socially maladjusted youth, PVA leased space in the Upper Perkiomen School District Administration Building. In June 1980, PVA made its home in a renovated tack shop on Route 73 in Obelisk, Pennsylvania. In August 1994, PVA relocated to its current education/recreation facility located on Hoffmansville Road in Frederick, Pennsylvania.

== Funding ==
PVA received its first funding through a grant from the federal juvenile justice system. Students are currently referred by the Montgomery County Juvenile Probation Department, Montgomery County Office of Children and Youth, and the local school districts. The students at PVA don't succeed in the traditional educational setting for a number of different reasons, including: academic failure, defiance of authority, use of alcohol and other drugs, inability to fit in with peers, and poor family relations. Many of these youngsters have often survived physical, sexual and emotional abuse.

Applying a combination of individualized academic programming and counseling services, the goal for PVA students is to ultimately accept responsibility for making needed changes. Graduates of the behavior program can complete their high school education in one of three ways:

1. Return to their regular public school to finish.
2. Complete high school graduation requirements at PVA and receive a high school diploma from their home school district.
3. Earn their General Equivalency Diploma (GED) and enter the job market, or move on to higher education.

Counseling is an integral part of PVA's treatment approach. Parental conferences convene every six weeks, with biweekly telephone contact. Intensive family counseling is available on an as-needed basis, and can occur at school or in the home. In his Master's Thesis Project: Systematic Programming to Increase Responsible Academic Learning—A Change Project in a Montgomery County Day Treatment Program (1987, Lincoln University), Bradley S. LeVan reports that "PVA, where academic concerns are combined with counseling and family intervention, is a sound model for day treatment. Both parents and students must take responsibility for setting and achieving specific goals." According to LeVan, the results include significantly improved academic scores.

== Faculty & Staff ==
The faculty and staff of PVA includes seven full-time and three part-time teacher/counselors; a full-time guidance counselor/therapist; a full-time administrator and a number of supportive staff persons who have a broad range of duties. Instruction is given in all core academic subjects, computer literacy, practical life skills, and GED training.

The goal of PVA is to help young people step into the future as healthier, more productive individuals.
