= Collegeville, Pennsylvania =

Borough in Pennsylvania, US

- Borough
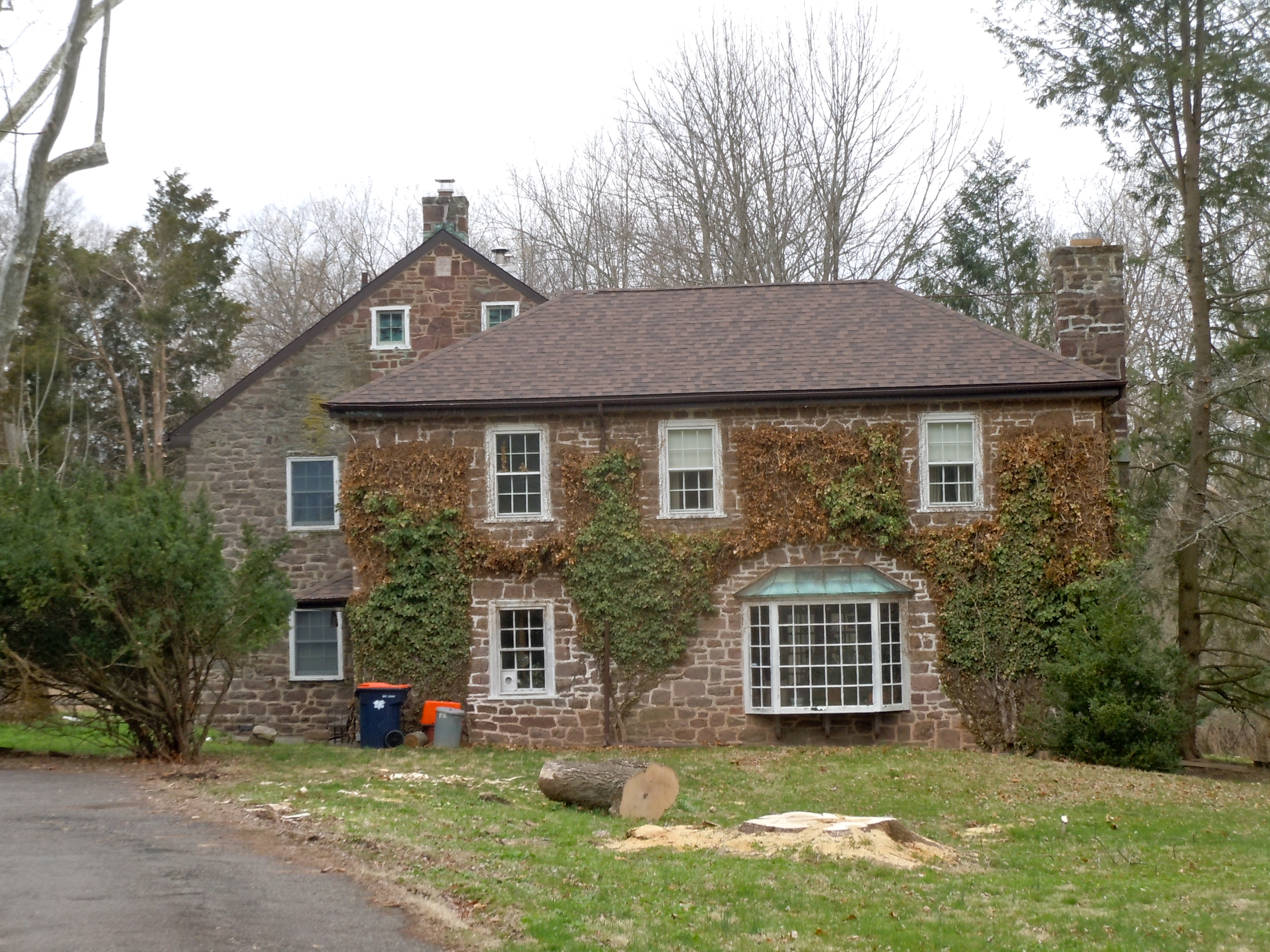
- Kuster Mill, built 1702 and located in nearby Skippack Township

- Logo

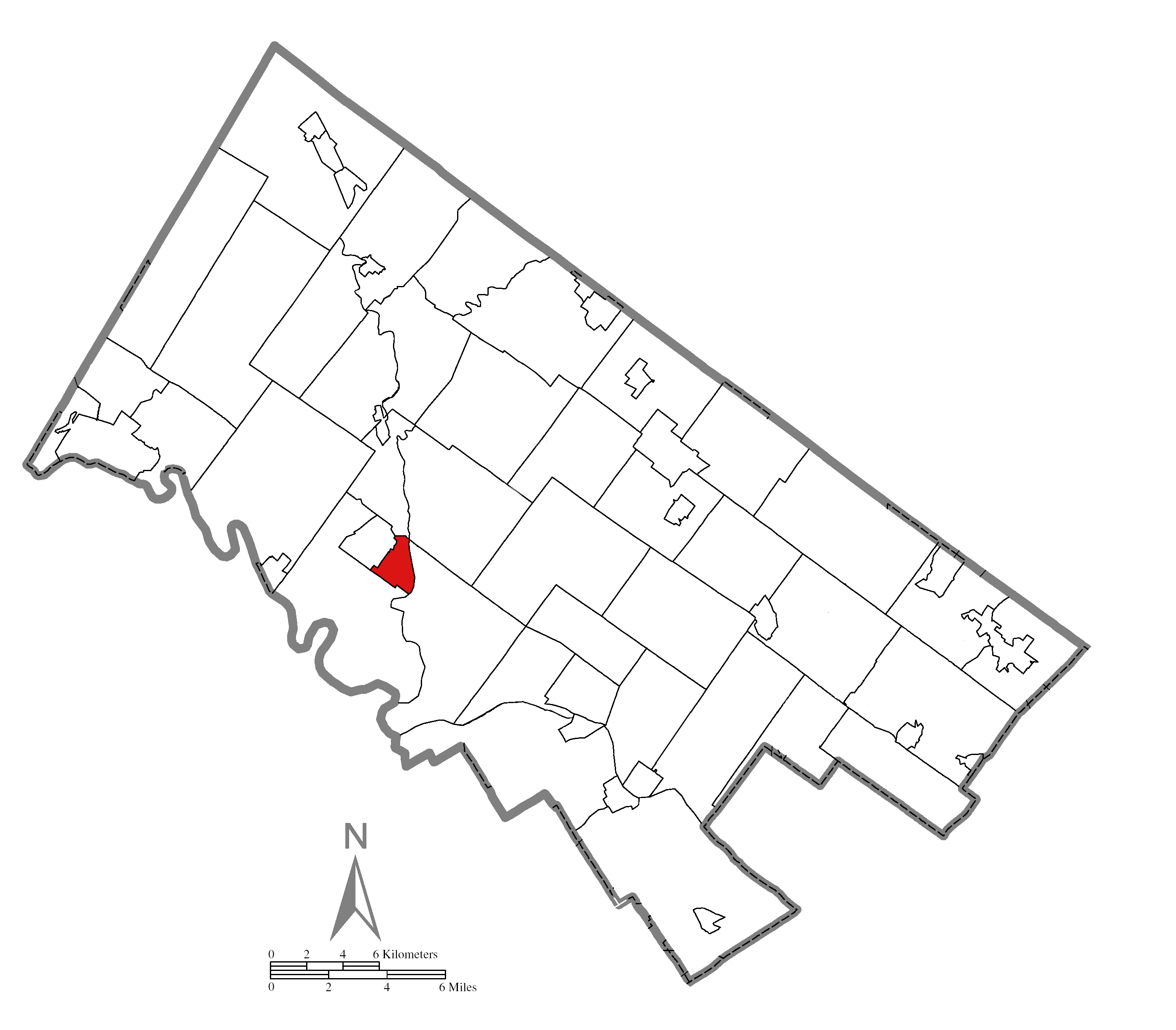
- Location of Collegeville in Montgomery County, Pennsylvania

- Location of Collegeville in Pennsylvania Collegeville (the United States)
- Coordinates: 40°11′08″N 75°27′30″W
- Country: United States
- State: Pennsylvania
- County: Montgomery
- Settled: 1684

Government
  - Type: Council-manager
  - Mayor: Aidsand Wright-Riggins

Area
  - Total: 1.61 sq mi (4.17 km^{2})
  - Land: 1.57 sq mi (4.07 km^{2})
  - Water: 0.039 sq mi (0.10 km^{2})
- Elevation: 207 ft (63 m)

Population (2020)
  - Total: 5,043
  - Density: 3,208.3/sq mi (1,238.75/km^{2})
- Time zone: UTC-5 (EST)
  - Summer (DST): UTC-4 (EDT)
- ZIP Codes: 19426, 19473
- Area code: 610
- FIPS code: 42-15192
- Website: www.collegeville-pa.gov

Collegeville is a borough in Montgomery County, Pennsylvania, a suburb outside of Philadelphia on Perkiomen Creek. Collegeville was incorporated in 1896. It is the location of Ursinus College, which opened in 1869. As of the 2020 census, Collegeville had a population of 5,043.

== History ==
The area which is present day Collegeville was part of the original William Penn purchase of "All the land lying on the Pahkehoma" in 1684. In 1799, Perkiomen Bridge was constructed using funds raised from a special lottery approved by the Pennsylvania Legislature. When the first post office in this area was established in 1847, it was called Perkiomen Bridge. In 1832, the first school for primary and secondary students was established as Todd's School. It was later renamed Freeland Public School in 1844. In 1848, Henry A. Hunsicker built the "Freeland Seminary of Perkiomen Bridge." The village around the school became known as Freeland. In 1851, Abraham Hunsicker – Henry's son – established the Pennsylvania Female College near present-day Glenwood Avenue. Ten years later, in 1861, the post office was moved and renamed Freeland.

When the trains first arrived in the area in 1868, there was a debate about naming of the station (Perkiomen Bridge vs Freeland). The local citizens acquired notoriety when they burned down the toll booth on the Perkiomen Bridge and threw the gate into the river. The rail company avoided any troubles by naming it "Collegeville" (the station was actually closer to the Pennsylvania Female College than either Freeland School or Perkiomen Bridge). Ursinus College was founded a year later in 1869. Thus the name "Collegeville" precedes the establishment of Ursinus College and it is actually named after the other 4-year liberal arts college (Pennsylvania Female College) which closed in 1880. Collegeville was incorporated as borough in 1896.

The Perkiomen Bridge and Perkiomen Bridge Hotel are listed on the National Register of Historic Places.

== Geography ==
Collegeville is located at 40°11′8″N 75°27′30″W. According to the U.S. Census Bureau, the borough has a total area of 1.6 square miles (4.1 km^{2}), of which 1.6 square miles (4.1 km^{2}) is land and 0.1 square miles (0.26 km^{2}) (3.70%) is water. It has a hot-summer humid continental climate (Dfa) and average monthly temperatures range from 31 °F (−1 °C) in January to 75.7 °F (24.3 °C) in July. The hardiness zone is 7a bordering upon 6b.

== Economy ==
Collegeville and the surrounding area are rapidly growing. Collegeville is home to Ursinus College and several local businesses. Outside the borough, Pfizer's pharmaceutical division and Dow Chemical share a global research and development campus. There is also a GlaxoSmithKline research and development facility. The Providence Town Center, an open-air shopping and restaurant mall, is located just outside Collegeville.

Collegeville is the home of the Church House (headquarters) of the Pennsylvania Southeast Conference of the United Church of Christ.

== Demographics ==
Historical population
Census	Pop.	Note	%±
1900	611		—
1910	621		1.6%
1920	681		9.7%
1930	878		28.9%
1940	976		11.2%
1950	1,900		94.7%
1960	2,254		18.6%
1970	3,191		41.6%
1980	3,406		6.7%
1990	4,227		24.1%
2000	4,992		18.1%
2010	5,089		1.9%
2020	5,043		−0.9%

Presidential elections results
Year	Republican	Democratic
2024	39.8% 1,178	59.4% 1,759
2020	38.0% 1,056	61.2% 1,699
2016	39.1% 986	55.3% 1,393
2012	43.2% 1,011	54.6% 1,275
2008	40.2% 1,011	58.8% 1,478
2004	46.6% 1,006	52.9% 1,142
2000	50.1% 852	47.5% 808

As of the 2010 census, the population of the borough was 89.4% White, 4.0% Black or African American, 0.2% Native American, 3.8% Asian, and 1.9% were two or more races. 2.4% of the population were of Hispanic or Latino ancestry.

As of the census of 2000, there were 8,032 people, 1,408 households, and 1,010 families residing in the borough. The racial makeup of the borough was 61.83% White, 31.19% African American, 0.10% Native American, 2.13% Asian, 0.01% Pacific Islander, 3.93% from other races, and 0.81% from two or more races. Hispanic or Latino of any race were 5.13% of the population. The 2000 census apparently included the population of State Correctional Institution - Graterford, located in nearby Skippack Township.

There were 1,408 households, out of which 38.3% had children under the age of 18 living with them, 61.9% were married couples living together, 7.2% had a female householder with no husband present, and 28.2% were non-families. 21.4% of all households were made up of individuals, and 5.7% had someone living alone who was 65 years of age or older. The average household size was 2.67 and the average family size was 3.17.

In the borough the population was spread out, with 12.9% under the age of 18, 17.6% from 18 to 24, 42.9% from 25 to 44, 21.4% from 45 to 64, and 5.2% who were 65 years of age or older. The median age was 35 years. For every 100 females there were 240.2 males. For every 100 females age 18 and over, there were 275.6 males.

The median income for a household in the borough was $77,499, and the median income for a family was $90,733. Males had a median income of $40,185 versus $39,236 for females. The per capita income for the borough was $23,080. About 1.0% of families and 2.0% of the population were below the poverty line, including none of those under age 18 and 2.1% of those age 65 or over.

== Politics and government ==
Collegeville has a city manager form of government with a mayor and a seven-member borough council. The members are as follows: President Catherine Kernen, Vice President Gary Hoffmann, President Pro Tempore Craig Farr, and councilpersons Valarie Beckius, Marion McKinney, Kathy Costello, and Damien Brewster. The current mayor is Aidsand Wright-Riggins.

The borough is part of the Fourth Congressional District (represented by Rep. Madeleine Dean), the 150th State House District (represented by Rep. Joe Webster) and the 24th State Senate District (represented by Sen. Tracy Pennycuick).

State Correctional Institution – Phoenix is a state prison of the Pennsylvania Department of Corrections in Skippack Township; it has a Collegeville postal address.

== Education ==
=== Primary and secondary education ===
==== Public ====
The borough of Collegeville is served by the Perkiomen Valley School District. Some nearby areas outside of the borough limits are served by Methacton School District and Spring-Ford Area School District.

==== Private ====
There is also one private parochial school, Holy Cross Regional Catholic School, which serves grades K-8. Holy Cross was formed in 2012 by the merger of St. Eleanor in Collegeville and Sacred Heart in Royersford. Pope John Paul II High School in Royersford is the area Catholic high school. Both are administered by the Archdiocese of Philadelphia.

=== Post-secondary education ===
The borough is also home to Ursinus College, established in 1869. Montgomery County Community College, with campuses in Blue Bell and Pottstown, provides community college services to Collegeville residents.

=== Library system and community education ===
The Montgomery County Library & Information Network Consortium (MCLINC) operates area bookmobiles, and physical libraries serving the Collegeville area including the Perkiomen Valley Library at Schwenksville, the Lower Providence Community Library in Eagleville, the Royersford Free Public Library, the Norristown public library, and the Phoenixville Public Library of the Chester County Library System.

=== Defunct institutions ===
Several other now-defunct primary, secondary, and post-secondary educational institutions were also located in Collegeville, all of which predate the founding of Ursinus College and the incorporation of Collegeville as a borough.

Todd's School was founded in 1832 as the area's primary and secondary school. It was known Freeland Public School from 1844 to 1874. The Freeland Seminary of Perkiomen Bridge, a post-secondary institution, was established in 1848. It and its land were purchased and turned into Ursinus College in 1869. Ursinus College also later came into possession of the building that was once Freeland Public School; that building is now known as Isenberg Hall, a residence hall located in the southwest corner of Ursinus's main campus.

Pennsylvania Female College, a post-secondary educational institution, was established in 1851 and closed in 1880.

== Transportation ==
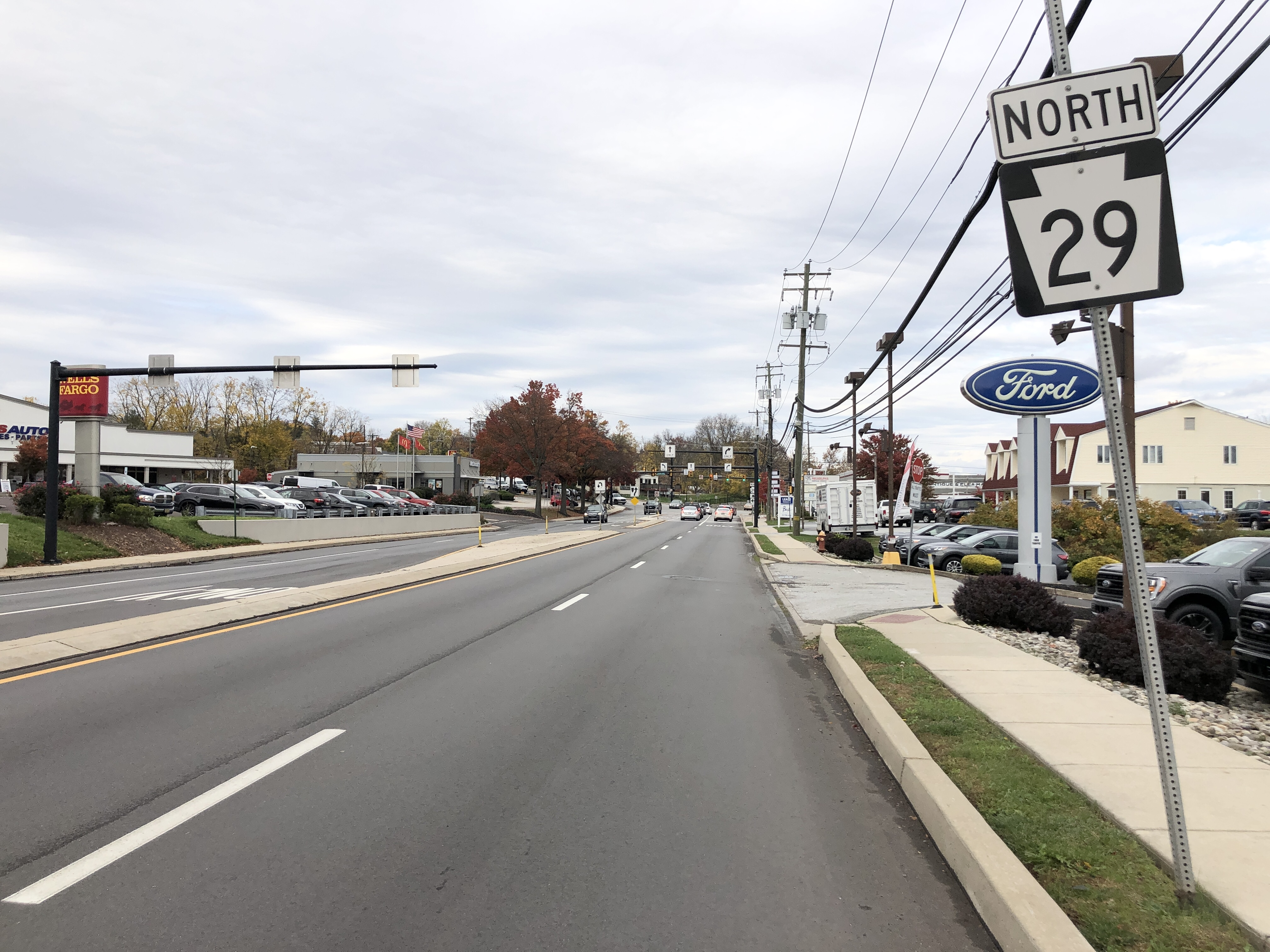
PA 29 northbound in Collegeville

As of 2021 there were 17.24 miles (27.75 km) of public roads in Collegeville, of which 3.31 miles (5.33 km) were maintained by the Pennsylvania Department of Transportation (PennDOT) and 13.93 miles (22.42 km) were maintained by the borough.

The southern segment of highway PA 29 is the only numbered highway which directly serves Collegeville, running north to Allentown and south to Malvern. PA 29 has an interchange with US 422 southwest of Collegeville; US 422 heads east toward King of Prussia and Philadelphia and west toward Pottstown and Reading.

SEPTA operates bus Route 93 along Collegeville's Main Street and Ridge Pike, running southeast to the Norristown Transportation Center in Norristown and northwest to Pottstown.

== Attractions ==
Collegeville offers multiple attractions, including skydiving, numerous shops and restaurants, horse-back riding and its well-known car show.

== Notable people ==
- Horace Ashenfelter, winner of the steeplechase at the 1952 Summer Olympics at Helsinki and Sullivan Award winner as outstanding amateur athlete for the year 1952.
- The Bloodhound Gang, rock band best known for their 2000 single, "The Bad Touch"
- CM Punk, former mixed martial artist and professional wrestler, lived in Collegeville between December 2003 and August 2005
- Jen Carfagno, meteorologist and broadcaster
- Tim Cooney, former baseball pitcher for the St. Louis Cardinals
- Joe DeRosa, stand-up comedian, author, actor and television writer
- Elin Hilderbrand, romance novelist.
- Michael R. Matz, an American Olympics equestrian rider and Thoroughbred horse trainer who won the 2006 Kentucky Derby.
- Lucy Olsen, WNBA player
- Gary Player, professional golfer, widely regarded as one of the greatest golfers of all time.
- J.D. Salinger, American author, attended Ursinus College in 1938.
