= List of multigenre conventions =

This is a list of multi-genre conventions. (Note: A convention is presumed noteworthy if it has received significant coverage in reliable sources that are independent of the convention and satisfies the inclusion criteria for a stand-alone article.) These cons typically do not cater to one particular genre (i.e., anime, science fiction, furry fandom, brony fandom, etc.), but instead cover the gamut of these pop culture phenomena without specifying itself as a specific convention of that variety. Many of these conventions were at one time specialized conventions, but have since spread out into multiple genres. Examples of this are San Diego Comic-Con and Animation On Display.

The list is divided up by location, and each convention includes dates during which it is typically held in parentheses. The dates listed are approximate or traditional time periods for each convention; for more details, please see the article or website of the individual convention(s) concerned.

== Africa ==
=== Egypt ===
- EgyCon, annual fan convention held in Cairo, Egypt since 2014.

== Asia ==
=== Western Asia (Middle East) ===
==== Bahrain ====
- AFK (at Media Center, Bahrain International Circuit, biennial)

=== East Asia ===
==== China ====
- China Digital Entertainment Expo & Conference (in Shanghai)

==== Hong Kong ====
- Animation-Comic-Game Hong Kong (in Hong Kong Convention and Exhibition Centre, in August)

==== Japan ====
- VketReal (in Akihabara, Harajuku, Ikebukuro, Osaka and Shibuya, in July and December)

=== Southeast Asia ===
==== Philippines ====
- Asia Pop Comic Convention (in Manila, Philippines)

==== Singapore ====
- EOY (in Singapore, in December)

== Europe ==
=== Belgium ===
- FACTS or F.A.C.T.S in Ghent, Belgium

=== Czech Republic ===
- Festival fantazie (in Chotěboř in July)

=== Italy ===
- Lucca Comics & Games (in Lucca in late October, early November)
- Napoli Comicon (in Naples, spring edition at the end of April; in Bergamo, summer edition at the end of June)
- Mantua Comics & Games (in Mantua at the beginning of March)
- Romics (in Rome, Spring edition in April, Autumn edition in October)

=== Poland ===
- Pyrkon (in Poznań, in March)
- Polcon (different city each year, last weekend of August)

=== Romania ===
- East European Comic Con (in Bucharest, in 9–11 May 2014)

=== Russia ===
- Comic-Con Russia (in Moscow, in October)

=== United Kingdom ===
- ACME Comic Con in Glasgow, in March and September
- Comic Con Liverpool in Liverpool, in March
- Comic Con Scotland in Edinburgh, Scotland in October
- Comic Con Wales in Newport, Wales in August
- Comic Con Northern Ireland in Lisburn, Belfast, Northern Ireland in September
- London Super Comic Convention in London, in March
- London Film and Comic Con (in London, in July)
- MCM London Comic Con (in London, in May and October)

== North America ==
=== Canada ===
- Calgary Expo (in Calgary in April)
- ConBravo! (in Hamilton in late July)
- Fan Expo Canada (in Toronto in August)
- Hal-Con (in Halifax in November)
- Montreal Comiccon (in Montreal in July)
- Pure Speculation (in Edmonton in November)
- Sci-Fi on the Rock (in St. John's in April)
- Toronto Comicon (in Toronto in March)
- VCON (in Vancouver in early October)

=== United States ===
Arranged by regional divisions used by the United States Census Bureau:

==== Northeast ====
===== New England =====
Connecticut, New Hampshire, Maine, Massachusetts, Rhode Island, and Vermont

- CarnageCon (in Killington, Vermont in November)
- ConnectiCon (in Hartford, Connecticut in July)
- Fan Expo Boston (in Boston, Massachusetts in August)

===== Middle Atlantic =====
New Jersey, New York, and Pennsylvania

- Flame Con (in New York City, New York in August)
- Genericon (in Troy, New York in March)
- New York Comic Con (in New York City, New York in October)
- Sci-Fi Valley Con (in Altoona, Pennsylvania in June)
- Thy Geekdom Con (in Oaks, Pennsylvania in May)
- Zenkaikon (in Lancaster, Pennsylvania in March/April)

==== Midwest ====
===== East North Central =====
Illinois, Indiana, Ohio, Michigan, Minnesota, and Wisconsin

- Archon (in Collinsville, Illinois in October)
- ConCoction (convention) (in Cleveland, Ohio in March)
- Chicago Comic & Entertainment Expo (in Chicago, Illinois in April)
- Geek.Kon (in Madison, Wisconsin in October)
- Motor City Comic Con (in Novi, Michigan in May)
- PopCon Indy (in Indianapolis, Indiana in August)
- Wizard World Chicago (in Rosemont, Illinois in August)

===== West North Central =====
Iowa, Kansas, Minnesota, Missouri, Nebraska, North Dakota, and South Dakota

- CONvergence (in Minneapolis, Minnesota in July)
- Planet Comicon Kansas City (in Kansas City, Missouri in March or April)

==== South ====
===== South Atlantic =====
Delaware, District of Columbia, Florida, Georgia, Maryland, North Carolina, South Carolina, Virginia, and West Virginia

- Blerdcon (in Arlington, Virginia in July)
- Dragon Con (in Atlanta, Georgia in September)
- Florida Supercon (in Greater Miami/Fort Lauderdale, Florida in July)
- HeroesCon (in Charlotte, North Carolina in June)
- Holiday Matsuri (in Orlando, Florida in December)
- JordanCon (in Atlanta, Georgia in April)
- MegaCon (in Orlando, Florida in February)
- MomoCon (in Atlanta, Georgia in May)
- MystiCon (in Roanoke, Virginia in February)
- Pensacon (in Pensacola, Florida in February)
- Spooky Empire (in Florida in the spring and autumn)

===== East South Central =====
Alabama, Kentucky, Mississippi, and Tennessee

- Chattacon (in Chattanooga, Tennessee in January)
- CoastCon (in Biloxi, Mississippi in early March)
- ConGlomeration (in Louisville, Kentucky in April)
- MidSouthCon (in Memphis, Tennessee in March
- MOBICON (in Mobile, Alabama in May)

===== West South Central =====
Arkansas, Louisiana, Oklahoma, and Texas

- AggieCon (in College Station, Texas in March)
- Alamo City Comic Con (in San Antonio, Texas in October)
- All-Con (in Dallas, Texas in March)
- ApolloCon (in Houston, Texas in June)
- Comicpalooza (in Houston, Texas over Memorial Day weekend in late May)
- Dream Con (in Houston, Texas in July)
- Fan Expo Dallas (in Dallas, Texas in May)

==== West ====
===== Mountain =====
Arizona, Colorado, Idaho, Montana, Nevada, New Mexico, Utah, and Wyoming

- ClexaCon (in Las Vegas, Nevada in April)
- Denver Comic Con (in Denver, Colorado in June)
- FanX (in Salt Lake City, Utah in September)
- Phoenix Fan Fusion (in Phoenix, Arizona in May)

===== Pacific =====
Alaska, California, Hawaii, Oregon, and Washington

- San Diego Comic-Con (in San Diego, California in July)
- Emerald City Comic Con (in Seattle, Washington in March)
- L.A. Comic Con (in Los Angeles, California in October)
- Pacific Media Expo (in Los Angeles, California in November)
- Rose City Comic Con (in Portland, Oregon in September)
- Silicon Valley Comic Con (in San Jose, California in March)
- SpoCon (in Spokane, Washington in August)
- VidCon (in Southern California in June/July)
- WonderCon (in Los Angeles, California in April)

=== Mexico ===
- Convencion de Juegos de Mesa y Comics (in Monterrey in March & November)

== Oceania ==
=== Australia ===
There are two main multigenre conventions in Australia, both of which run shows in multiple cities under the same name:

- Oz Comic Con (in Perth, Adelaide, Melbourne, Canberra, Brisbane, and Sydney, as well as a Xmas themed edition in Melbourne in December.)
- Supanova Pop Culture Expo (in Brisbane, Sydney, Perth and Melbourne)

=== New Zealand ===
- Armageddon Expo
- Overload Comic and Manga Convention

== South America ==
=== Brazil ===
- Comic Con Experience (in São Paulo, São Paulo in December)

=== Uruguay ===
- Continuará... (in Uruguay, in November)

== See also ==
- List of anime conventions
- List of comic book conventions
- List of furry conventions
- List of gaming conventions
- List of My Little Pony conventions
- List of science fiction conventions
- List of Worldcons
