= Thy Geekdom Con =

Convention in Oaks, PA

Coordinates: 40.12330°N 75.45843°W

- Status: Active
- Genre: Multi-genre including Anime, Manga, Comic Books, Video games, Tabletop games, Cosplay
- Venue: Greater Philadelphia Expo Center at Oaks
- Location: Oaks, Pennsylvania
- Country: United States
- Inaugurated: April 18, 2015; 11 years ago
- Organizer: Sparrowpeak LLC
- Website: https://www.thygeekdomcon.com/

Thy Geekdom Con is a multi-genre convention held annually at the Greater Philadelphia Expo Center in Oaks, Pennsylvania. The convention has a wide array of activities that feature panels, live performances, video game tournaments, artist alley, dealers room, and celebrity guests.

== Programming ==
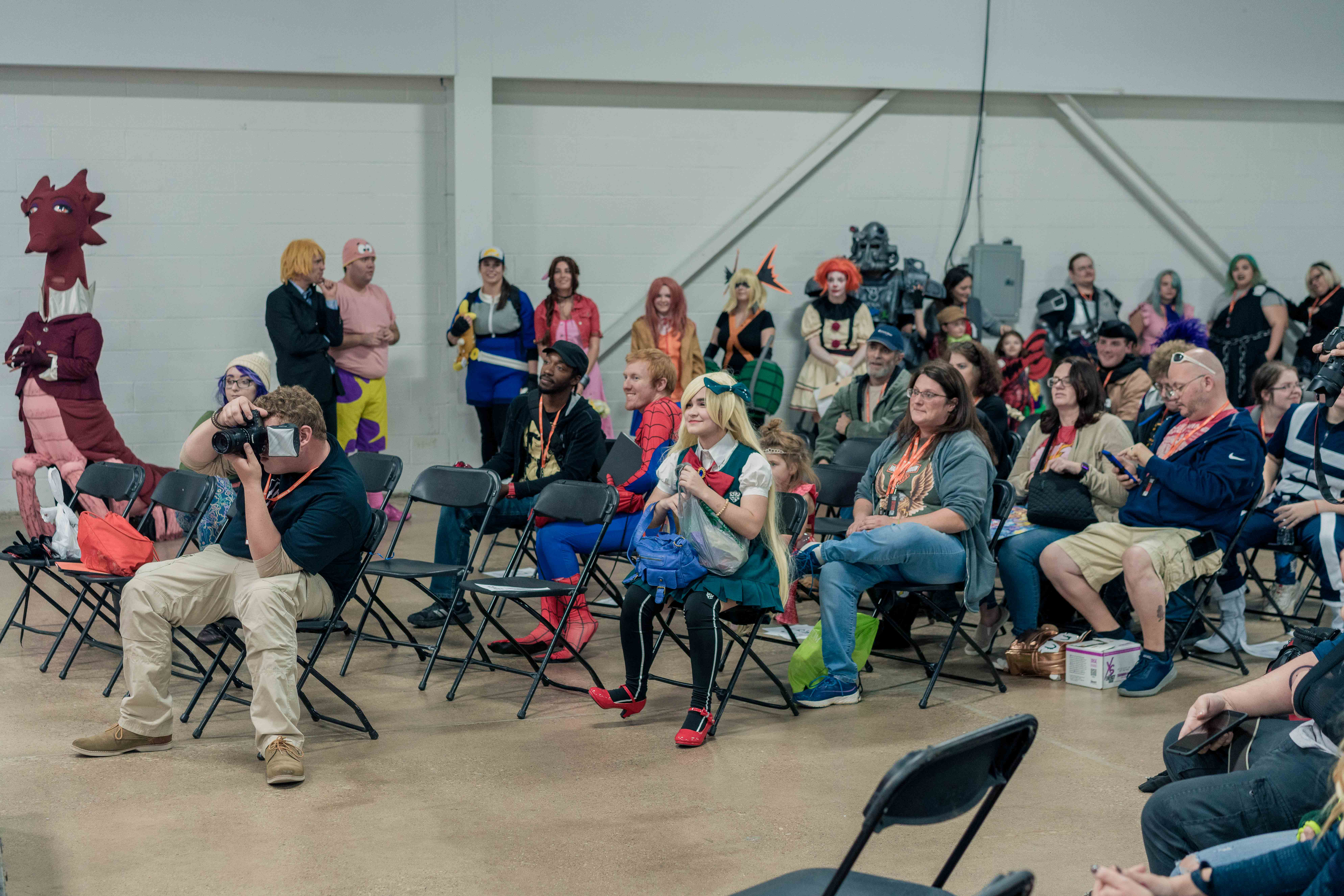
Thy Geekdom Con 2018 Cosplay Contest Audience

The convention holds panels and workshops on comic books, video gaming, costuming, and related topics from popular culture. Free play and tournaments include Super Smash Bros., Tekken, Injustice: Gods Among Us, Marvel Vs. Capcom, Mortal Kombat, and Dragon Ball FighterZ, as well as board games and role playing games. Live performances have included bands, DJs, hypnotists, Rocky Horror Picture Show performances, karaoke, and Love Live! dance performances.

== History ==
The first convention was held on April 18 of 2015 in Glen Mills, Pennsylvania. The following three conventions were held at varying venues in the Wilmington, Delaware area from November 2015 to November 2017, and at the Greater Philadelphia Expo Center in 2018. The convention expanded to two days in 2017, and three days in 2018. The 2020 convention was cancelled and deferred to 2021 due to the COVID-19 pandemic.

=== Event history ===
Dates	Location	Approximate Attendance	Guests
April 18, 2015	Wyndham Garden Glen Mills Wilmington; Glen Mills, PA	250	
November 14, 2015	Crowne Plaza Wilmington North; Claymont, DE	550	
November 5, 2016	DoubleTree by Hilton Hotel Wilmington; Wilmington, DE	850	
November 4–5, 2017	Crowne Plaza Wilmington North; Claymont, DE	1,800	Max Mittelman
November 2–4, 2018	Greater Philadelphia Expo Center; Oaks, PA	2,700	Colleen Clinkenbeard, Megan Shipman, Katelyn Barr, Matthew Atchley
May 24–26, 2019	Greater Philadelphia Expo Center; Oaks, PA	3,100	Cherami Leigh, Kira Buckland, Kyle McCarley
May 22–24, 2020	Greater Philadelphia Expo Center; Oaks, PA	Cancelled	Brina Palencia, Alexis Tipton, Chris Rager
May 28–30, 2021	Greater Philadelphia Expo Center; Oaks, PA	Cancelled	
May 27–29, 2022	Greater Philadelphia Expo Center; Oaks, PA	4,200	J. Michael Tatum, Jamie Marchi, Alexis Tipton, Brandon McInnis, Chase Masterson
May 26–28, 2023	Greater Philadelphia Expo Center; Oaks, PA	5,600	Brina Palencia, Todd Haberkorn, Trina Nishimura, Mike McFarland, Martha Harms, Chuck Huber, Walter Emanuel Jones, John Swasey, R. Bruce Elliot
May 24–26, 2024	Greater Philadelphia Expo Center; Oaks, PA	6,200	Johnny Yong Bosch, David Lodge, Justin Cook, Aaron Dismuke, Stephanie Nadolny, Jessie James Grelle, Austin Tindle, David Vincent, Tia Ballard, Griffin Burns, Lindsay Seidel, Mark Whitten, Joe Zieja
May 23–25, 2025	Greater Philadelphia Expo Center; Oaks, PA	6,600	John Burgmeier, Greg Chun, Leah Clark, Kieran Flitton, Jason Liebrecht, Elizabeth Maxwell, Robert McCollum, Joel McDonald, Chris Rager, Jad Saxton, Jonah Scott, Alexis Tipton, Linda Young, Stephanie Young
May 22–24, 2026	Greater Philadelphia Expo Center; Oaks, PA	6,800	Justin Briner, Clifford Chapin, D.C. Douglas, Dan Green, Richard Cansino, Todd Haberkorn, Jessie James Grelle, Chuck Huber, Neil Kaplan, Kristen McGuire, Keith Silverstein, Eric Stuart, Eric Vale
May 28–30, 2027	Greater Philadelphia Expo Center; Oaks, PA		

== See also ==
- List of multigenre conventions
