= Gather Her Round =

2017 novel by Alex Bledsoe

- First edition cover
- Author: Alex Bledsoe
- Language: English
- Series: Tufa
- Genre: Urban fantasy
- Publisher: Tor Books
- Publication date: March 2017
- Publication place: United States
- Media type: Hardback
- Pages: 320
- ISBN: 978-0-7653-8334-1
- Preceded by: Chapel of Ease
- Followed by: The Fairies of Sadieville

Gather Her Round is an urban fantasy novel by American writer Alex Bledsoe, first published in the United States in March 2017 by Tor Books. It is the fifth in a series of six books by Bledsoe about the Tufa living in a remote Appalachian valley in East Tennessee. The Tufa are descendants of Irish fairies and were found in the area when the first European settlers arrived.

Gather Her Round generally received positive reviews from critics. The book's name was taken from the title of a song by South Carolina singer-songwriter Jennifer Goree that was released on her 1996 eponymous album.

== Development ==
Bledsoe has emphasized the importance of songs to the Tufa, saying that they "manifest their faerie magic via music, and use its power to influence the world at large". The song lyrics used in Gather Her Round were sourced from traditional ballads, for example "Lily of the West" and "The Dead Brother's Song", and texts Bledsoe wrote himself.

At one point when writing Gather Her Round, Bledsoe could not find a song he needed for a particular piece of narrative. He called on Jen Cass and Eric Janetsky, musician friends from the Americana band the Lucky Nows. The song the pair wrote was "Against the Black", which Bledsoe used in the book. It was later released as the lead song on the band's debut album, Rise.

== Plot introduction ==
At a storytelling festival, Janet tells a story of Kera Rogers, a Tufa youngster who is killed in the woods by a huge wild boar. Members of the Tufa community, including Duncan Gowen, Kera's boyfriend, and Duncan's friend, Adam Procure, search the woods for the beast. Duncan discovers that Adam is also Kera's boyfriend, and finds he not only wants to avenge Kera's death, but also her betrayal. When Adam goes missing, it is unclear whether the boar took him, or Duncan. As the search continues, the beast starts to take on supernatural proportions.

== Critical reception ==
In a review in Fantasy Literature, Kat Hooper described Gather Her Round as "gruesome", "psychologically intense" and "the darkest and most disturbing TUFA story yet". She added that Bledsoe's use of music in the novel is more pronounced here than in the previous Tufa books as it adds to the story's "fear and dread". Hooper found several of the new characters "intriguing", especially Janet, the story's narrator. Hooper gave the novel four stars out of five.

Liz Bourke called Gather Her Round an "elegantly constructed murder ballad". In a review in Locus, Bourke wrote that it is not "flashy fantasy" – it has a "folkloric, mythic quality", and the fantasy elements have a "deftly understated flair". She described the book's characterization as "admirably adroit" that emphasizes "character and community" and "grief and guilt and consequences". Bourke felt that while Gather Her Round does not "reach the emotional heights or graceful prose" of The Hum and the Shiver, it still is "a very satisfying read."

A review of Gather Her Round in Publishers Weekly described the book as a "beautiful ... atmospheric tale". It stated that Bledsoe continues to "adeptly blend fairy tales and folklore" and delves deeper into the Tufa's origins as exiled fairies. The reviewer's only complaint was the story within a story framing sequence where the book's narrative is largely being told by a storyteller. They felt that while it was "solidly executed, [it] draws away some of the tension."

Canadian fantasy writer Charles de Lint wrote that Gather Her Round's giant killer hog reminded him of Joe R. Lansdale's 1998 novel, The Boar. Even though the two books are very different, de Lint said the characters in both works hunt down their monster pig with "Moby-Dick intensity". He found Gather Her Round's framing device interesting, particularly the way Bledsoe explains its purpose in the last chapter. de Lint said that as with the previous Tufa books in the series, this novel is full of "[b]eautiful prose, hillbilly faerie ... and a sense of wonder that never quits".

== Works cited ==
- Bledsoe, Alex (2017). Gather Her Round. Tor Books. ISBN 978-0-7653-8334-1.
