= Gamers Outreach Foundation =

Nonprofit organization

- Founded: 2007
- Founder: Zach Wigal
- Type: 501(c)(3)
- Location: Saline, Michigan
- Region served: Global
- Website: gamersoutreach.org

Gamers Outreach Foundation (stylized as Gamers Outreach) is an American 501(c)(3) nonprofit organization that provides video game equipment and programs for use in hospitals. Based in Saline, Michigan, the foundation works with healthcare facilities to provide video game equipment and related programs in medical settings.

The organization was founded in 2007 by Zach Wigal, a high school student from Saline, following the cancellation of a Halo 2 tournament he had organized, which he later described as motivating him to establish a group focused on gaming-related charitable activities. Gamers Outreach manages initiatives including the GO Kart, a portable gaming station used in hospital rooms, and Player 2, a volunteer program through which participants assist patients with gameplay.

According to CNN Heroes, Gamers Outreach “brings video games to children in hospitals who might otherwise have no access” and Forbes has profiled Wigal's work. As of 2024, the foundation reports that its programs operate in more than 450 healthcare facilities in 13 countries.

== History ==
In March 2007, Saline High School student Zach Wigal organized a Halo 2 tournament that had more than 300 registered participants before it was cancelled two days prior to the event.

Wigal and his friends then began organizing a new event connected to charitable gaming activities. In 2008, Wigal worked with local LAN party participants to launch Gamers For Giving (GFG), a competitive gaming tournament and LAN event that was also a fundraiser.

During the planning of the new tournament, Gamers Outreach Foundation was established. Initially created to support GFG, the organization later developed additional programs related to video gaming in medical settings.

In 2009, Gamers Outreach began working with C.S. Mott Children's Hospital of Ann Arbor, Michigan to supply video game equipment for use by patients.

== Programs ==
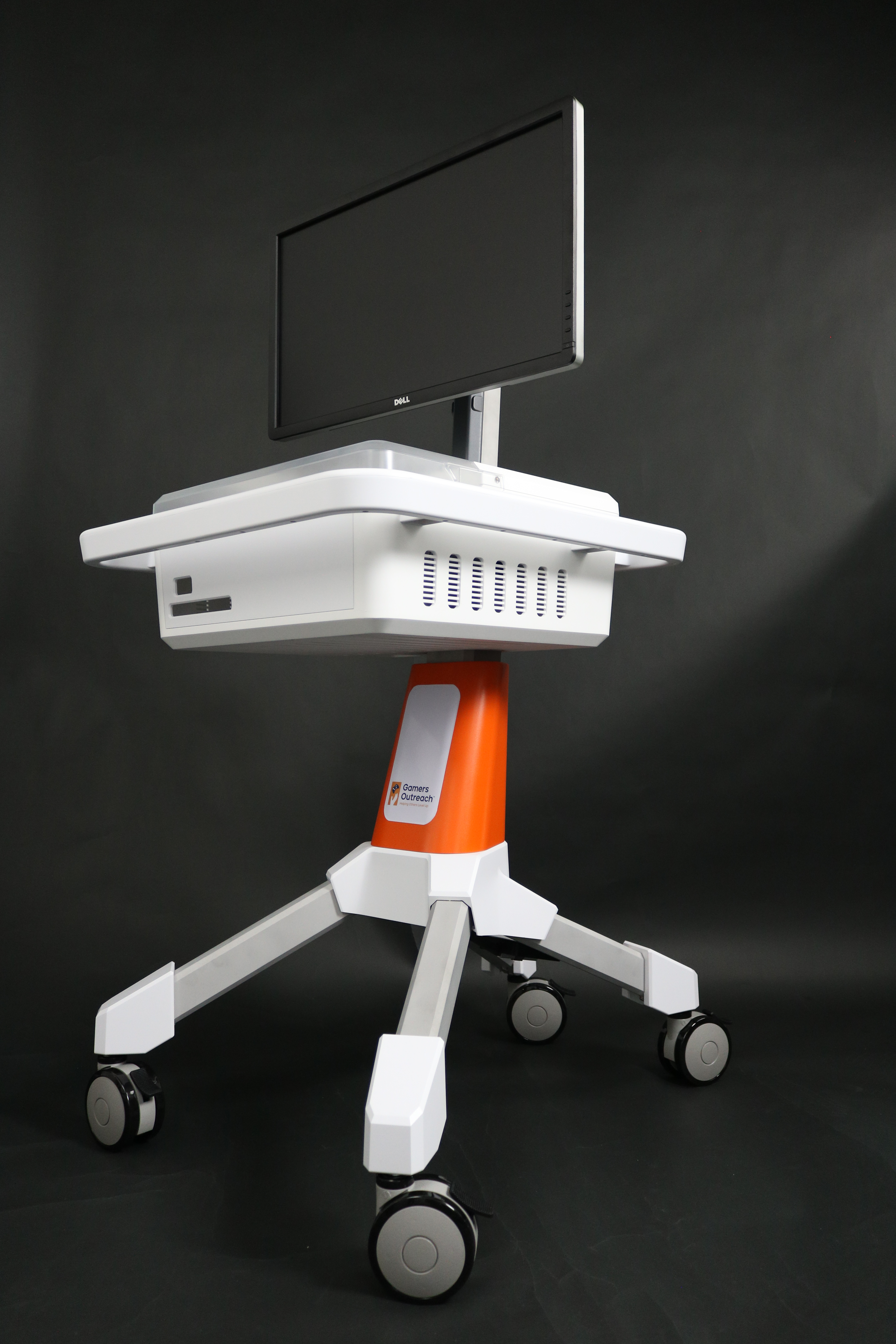
The GO Kart 3.0, the latest iteration of Gamers Outreach's gaming kiosks, designed for use at medical facilities.

Gamers Outreach operates several programs and initiatives, including the GO Kart program, Player 2, and Save Point.

=== GO Kart ===
Short for "Gamers Outreach Kart", the GO Kart program is a mobile kiosk equipped with a monitor, a video game console, and controllers. Each unit operates using a single power outlet.

The structure of the device is intended to be disinfected easily. It is equipped with swivel wheels, making it appropriate for transport and hospitals. It also include a lift mechanism that allows the height to be adjusted. Equipped monitors can also be adjusted to be played horizontally or vertically, intended for patients who want to play while lying down on their side.

In 2024, the foundation reported that it fulfilled 370 GO Kart units, with its efforts reaching 223 healthcare facilities to date. The foundation maintains a "hospital wish list" to track requests for GO Kart units from medical organizations.

=== Player 2 ===
Player 2 is a program that pairs gamers with opportunities to volunteer at hospitals. Those interested can apply, and hospitals may enroll their facilities on the Gamers Outreach website.

The program is designed to assist hospitals in need of volunteers available during weekday business hours. Volunteer responsibilities include bringing entertainment to hospital patients, ensuring that video game equipment is well maintained, and playing video games with patients looking for a second player. Hospitals can also assign additional tasks to Player 2 volunteers as necessary.

=== Save Point ===
"Save Points" are vending machines placed in health care facilities to distribute toys, games, wearables, and other relevant items to children receiving care. The organization's goal for this program is to inspire accomplishment in kids progressing in their treatment.

== Fundraising ==
Gamers Outreach organizes several programs and initiatives to assist in their fundraising efforts. One of them are streamathons, where affiliated content creators and streamers host charity streams on their Twitch pages with Gamers Outreach as the primary beneficiary. The foundation's annual events include Gamers For Giving (GFG), VTuber Summer Slam, Spooktacular Streamathon, and Jolly Jamboree. Gamers Outreach also regularly holds booths at conventions such as PAX, EVO, TwitchCon, and Holiday Matsuri. Funds collected from these events support Gamers Outreach's programs.

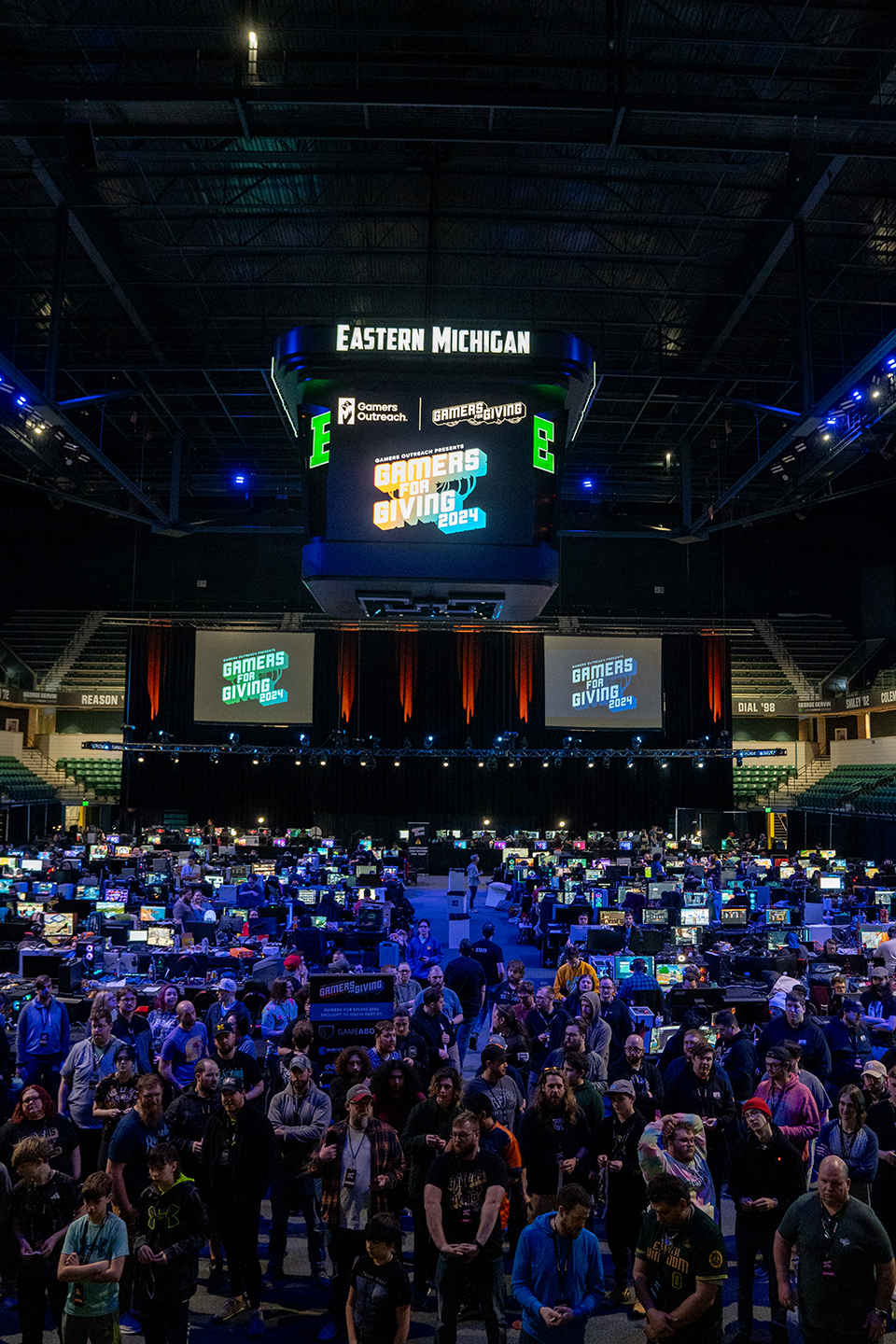
The Gamers For Giving 2024 LAN Party at the George Gervin Game Above Center in Eastern Michigan University.

=== Gamers For Giving ===
Gamers for Giving (GFG) consists of both an in-person production featuring a LAN Party and video game tournaments, and an online streaming marathon to raise funds for the foundation's programming initiatives.

Over 1,200 people attended the 2024 GFG LAN Party, and the event raised over $1.25 million.

Alongside Gamers For Giving 2025, a separate took place on April 12–13 at Mojang Studios in Redmond US. The event took place with members of the Hermitcraft Minecraft SMP (survival multiplayer) and its associates, organized by YouTuber GoodTimesWithScar, he himself having a neuromuscular disease. In total, the event raised $841,517.63. After the 2025 event, Scar was added to Gamers Outreach's Board of Directors, following his enthusiasm for the charity's cause and large efforts to support the charity over the years of working with them. This was their second year of supporting an in-person Gamers Outreach event, which raised over $840,000 in 2024.

The 2026 event saw continued support from the Hermitcraft community, raising $1,126,351, contributing to a record-breaking year, with over $1.8 million raised collectively. In August 2026, the first GO Kart donated to a hospital in Thailand was donated to the Samitivej Srinakarin Hospital in Bangkok.

=== VTuber Summer Slam ===
The VTuber Summer Slam is a virtual fundraising marathon that takes place over the course of five days in June. While fundraising participants do not have to be VTubers, they do make up the vast majority of supporters for the event.

In addition to charity streaming, Gamers Outreach also holds an art contest and creates merchandise for both participants and supporters to wear as an alternative way to contribute to the fundraiser.

VTuber Summer Slam 2024 raised $740,843. The amount was enough to fund 200 GO Karts for hospitals requesting them.

=== Spooktacular Streamathon ===
Spooktacular Streamathon is Gamers Outreach's Halloween-themed virtual fundraising marathon that takes place during October. Like VTuber Summer Slam, Spooktacular also features an art contest for participants as well as merchandise to purchase. It also features a costume contest that participants can enter using real in-person costumes or digital art they have created.

Spooktacular Streamathon 2024 raised $402,182, which helped fulfill 68 GO Karts and 4 Save Point Machines.

=== Jolly Jamboree ===
Jolly Jamboree is Gamers Outreach's winter-themed virtual fundraising event that takes place over four days in December.

2024's Jolly Jamboree marked the first time Gamers Outreach hosted an end-of-year fundraising event. The event raised $139,000, according to their X profile.

=== The GRID ===
The GRID is Gamers Outreach's monthly donor program. Supporters receive perks such as early access to Gamers For Giving tickets, a monthly newsletter and gift, and the ability to attend a quarterly call with Gamers Outreach staff to stay updated on all happenings within the foundation.
