= Greenline (Pennsylvania) =

Overview
- Status: Canceled
- Owner: Norfolk Southern Railway
- Locale: Upper Schuylkill Valley, Pennsylvania
- Termini: Oaks, Pennsylvania; Paoli, Pennsylvania
- Stations: 18

Service
- Type: Tram-train

Technical
- Line length: 18 miles (29 kilometres)
- Track gauge: 1,435 mm (4 ft 8 1/2 in)

The Greenline was a proposed $138 million mass transit line for the Upper Schuylkill Valley region in southeastern Pennsylvania in the United States. The line was advocated by the group Citizens for the Train. Grant money needed to fund a feasibility study was not successfully obtained. Since 2014, there have been no plans to move forward with the project.

== Planning ==
Citizens for the Train spearheaded the Greenline's planning stages, and concluded a preliminary study (performed by engineering firm Gannett Fleming Inc.) to determine the feasibility of the project. The group compiled $250,000 for an alternative analysis to see if a different transportation project, such as widening roads or adding bus routes, would work better. The study was slated for completion by the end of 2009.

Citizens for the Train pursued an estimated $1.5 million for an environmental and engineering study. Funding for the project was sought from both public and private sources.

Due to the ill-fated $2 billion Schuylkill Valley Metro (SVM) project, the Greenline proposal received support from regional politicians and businesses. The Greenline remains part of the Chester County Transportation Improvements Inventory (TII) document for 2009-2010. No funding has been allocated for design or construction.

== Route ==
The proposed route was to originate in Oaks, Pennsylvania, with the Oaks terminal situated at the new Greater Philadelphia Expo Center at Oaks. The route would utilize Norfolk Southern Railway's (NS) out of service 11-mile (18 km) Phoenixville Industrial Track (former Pennsylvania Railroad Frazer Branch), with an additional seven miles of new railway construction built between the end-of-track in Devault and the current Amtrak/SEPTA Paoli station.

The bulk of the route is the Phoenixville Industrial Track. Never a prominent line, the route gained momentum in its later years. With aid from PennDOT, the single-track line received a substantial infrastructure upgrade via Conrail in the late 1980s. New wooden ties were laid, new ballast was added and drainage was significantly improved. In addition, grade crossings received additional protective hardware, including flashers, bells, and gates. However over time industries along the line either closed or switched to trucks. Freight service continued through 2004, when the last customer American Sweetener Corporation, whose plant was located at the end of the line in Devault, closed its doors. NS applied to officially discontinue rail service on the line in October 2007, which became effective that December.

The route transverses the Pickering Valley region, terminating at SEPTA's heavily used Paoli/Thorndale Line of commuter rail. Paoli station also hosts Amtrak's Keystone Service and Pennsylvanian, serving trains en route to Harrisburg, Pittsburgh and New York City.

== Equipment ==
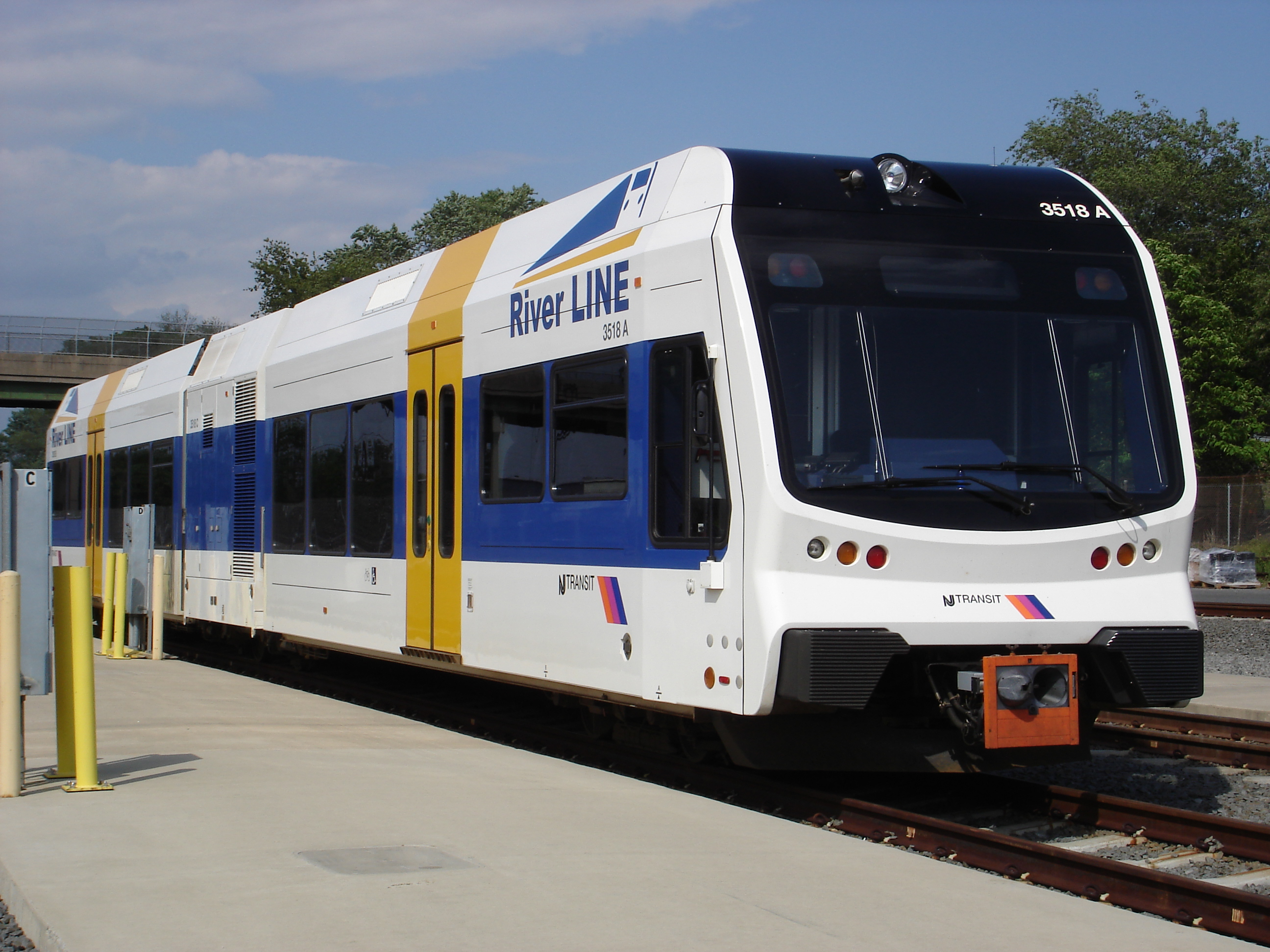
Diesel-electric diesel multiple unit cars currently used on New Jersey Transit's River LINE were considered for the Greenline

=== Diesel-electric DMUs ===
Several options for train equipment were being considered. One is the Stadler GTW-built diesel-electric DMU (diesel multiple unit) cars used on New Jersey Transit's River LINE.

=== RDCs ===
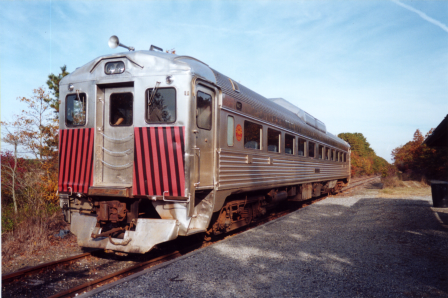
Refurbished RDC unit currently operating on Cape May Seashore Lines in Cape May, New Jersey

Another less expensive option was refurbished Budd Rail Diesel Cars, which last carried passengers through Phoenixville in July 1981 when SEPTA terminated all diesel trains between Pottsville and Philadelphia.

== List of proposed stations ==
- Oaks Park-Ride / Route 422 Marketplace / Greater Philadelphia Expo Center at Oaks
- Longford Road
- Port Providence
- Mont Clare
- Phoenixville:
  - Phoenixville Transportation Center
  - Franklin Street
  - Ironsides
  - Wilmer (Pothouse Road)
- Pickering
- Commons at Great Valley
- Atwater
- Great Valley:
  - Great Valley Parkway
  - Valley Stream West
  - Valley Stream East
- Swedesford Road
- Worthington/Vanguard
- Wyeth
- Paoli Transportation Center

== See also ==
- Schuylkill Valley Metro
- Paoli/Thorndale Line
