= Geek.Kon =

Multi-genre convention in Madison, Wisconsin

- Geek.Kon logo
- Status: Inactive
- Genre: Multi-genre
- Venue: Marriott Madison West Hotel and Convention Center
- Location: Middleton, Wisconsin
- Country: United States
- Inaugurated: 2007
- Most recent: 2018
- Attendance: 2,585 (in 2016)
- Organizer: Geek.Kon, Inc.
- Filing status: Not-for-profit
- Website: www.geekkon12.net

Geek.Kon was a multi-genre convention in Madison, Wisconsin.

== History ==
The convention was started by UW students Louise Behnke, head of the SciFi Club, and Jackie Lee, head of the Anime Club. The two groups and the Madison Academics’ Gaming Enthusiast Society were planning the convention by March 2007. Geek.Kon was first held began in October 2007 at the University of Wisconsin–Madison's George L. Mosse Humanities Building as a two-day free convention. Expecting hundreds, it received over 1800 attendees. In 2008, the convention expanded to include one of the upper floors of nearby Vilas Hall. In 2009 the convention separated from the University of Wisconsin, went private, moved to the Madison Sheraton Hotel, expanded to three days, and began charging admission. Beginning in 2010, the convention moved to the Marriott Madison West Hotel in Middleton and has been there ever since.

== Event history ==
Dates	Location	Atten.	Guests
October 6–7, 2007	University of Wisconsin–Madison; Madison, Wisconsin	1,800	Blame Society Productions, Luke Ski, Monte Cook, Joan Vinge, Sarah Monette, Aaron Pavao, Studio AntiThesis
September 27–28, 2008	University of Wisconsin–Madison; Madison, Wisconsin	1,144	Luke Ski, Chad Vader, David Salo, Sarah Monette, Aaron Pavao, Steam Century, Studio AntiThesis
October 23–25, 2009	Madison Sheraton Hotel; Madison, Wisconsin	1,036	Kyle Hebert, Raven Software, Chad Corrie, Steam Century, Aaron Pavao, The Spoony Bards, Fermata, Studio AntiThesis.
September 3–5, 2010	Marriott Madison West; Middleton, Wisconsin	1,211	Christopher Ayres, Eric Vale, John Kovalic, Raven Software, Jim Frenkel, Bill Bodden, Matt Forbeck, Aaron Pavao, Monica Valentinelli, Matt McElroy, The Spoony Bards, Dr. Cancer and the SKAmbies.
September 9–11, 2011	Marriott Madison West; Middleton, Wisconsin	1,625	Bill Bodden, Troy Denning, Matt Forbeck, Jerry Jewell, John Kovalic, Aaron Pavao, David Salo, Sonny Strait, Monica Valentinelli, I Fight Dragons
September 7–9, 2012	Marriott Madison West; Middleton, Wisconsin	1,800	Elaine Cunningham, Caitlin Glass, Jerry Jewell, Matt McElroy, Aaron Pavao, Michael Stackpole, Eric Stuart, Monica Valentinelli
August 23–25, 2013	Marriott Madison West; Middleton, Wisconsin	2,018	Bill Bodden, Tim Buckley, Bridget Landry, Matt M. McElroy, John Jackson Miller, Chris Patton, Aaron Pavao, Ryan Reynolds, David Salo, Alexis Tipton, Monica Valentinelli, Rob Wieland
August 22–24, 2014	Marriott Madison West; Middleton, Wisconsin		Tia Ballard, Bea "LittleKuriboh" Billany, Alex Bledsoe, Bill Bodden, Chris Cason, Christopher Jones, John Kovalic, Matt M. McElroy, Marin Miller, Aaron Pavao, Joseph Scrimshaw, Mark Stegbauer, Monica Valentinelli
August 21–23, 2015	Marriott Madison West; Middleton, Wisconsin		Greg Weisman, Jan Scott-Frazier, Ned the Dead, Matt Greenfield, Emma Bull, Mark Stegbauer, Alex Bledsoe, Christopher Jones, Tiffany Grant, Bill Bodden, Matt M. McElroy, Monica Valentinelli, Aaron Pavao, Will Shetterly
August 26–28, 2016	Marriott Madison West; Middleton, Wisconsin	2,585	Jerry Jewell, Ryan Reynolds, Christina Kelly, Jason Carter, Bill Bodden, Matt M. McElroy, Monica Valentinelli, Aaron Pavao, Alex Bledsoe, Mark Stegbauer, Briana Lawrence, Catie Pfeifer, Enrica Jang, Jennifer Smith, Jessica Walsh, John Jackson Miller, Melissa Olson, Peter Liethen.
August 25–27, 2017	Marriott Madison West; Middleton, Wisconsin	~1,800	Jeff Nimoy, Robert Axelrod, Brad Swaile, Eloy Lasanta, Neall Raemonn Price, Linkara, Bill Bodden, Monica Valentinelli, Matt McElroy, and Crystal Mazur
August 24–26, 2018	Marriott Madison West; Middleton, Wisconsin		Michael Winslow, Jeff Nimoy, Lex Lang, Brian Donovan, Nikki Boyer, Jonathan Fahn
