= Horror convention =

Gathering of horror fiction fans

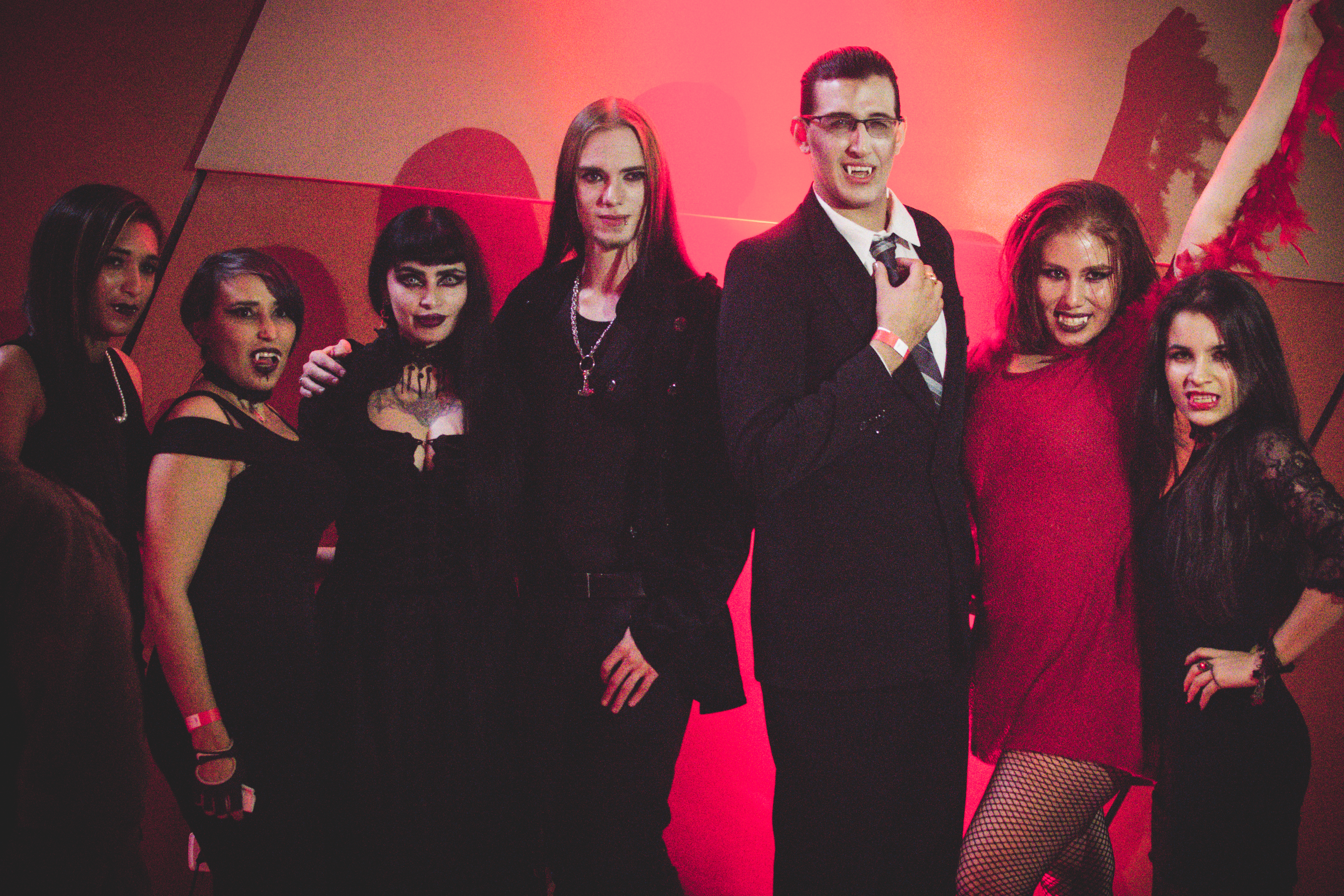
Horror fans at Colombia Terror Fest 2018.

Horror conventions are gatherings of the community of fans of various forms of horror including horror cinema, goth lifestyle, and occasionally science fiction and fantasy. Historically the focus has been on the cinematic form rather than literature and art, but this has broadened to include all forms in recent years. People in attendance at a horror convention are traditionally known as members of the convention; invited celebrities including film directors and stars are commonly known as guests of the convention, though many professionals including directors will simply attend as members.

== Anatomy of a typical horror convention ==
=== Getting started ===
The first morning of most conventions, the "Opening Ceremonies" are held, where organizers and marquee guests are introduced and speeches might be made. Some conventions such as Weekend of Horrors will play horror-themed music and video.

=== Program ===
Panel-led discussions, or Panels, usually fill up the daytime hours of most conventions with typically one-hour discussions of topics related to horror films, horror literature, and fandom in general.

Evening entertainment often includes a combination of official and unofficial events, including dances, formal invitational dinners, and fandom-themed room parties. A bid party is a room party held to influence the choice of the location of a future convention by advertising its advantages.

A costume contest called a masquerade is often held where persons go on stage and compete for nominal prizes based on their skill in assembling and presenting horror-inspired outfits. This is truly more a "talent show" rather than the "fancy dress ball" that the term suggests (although British fandom sometimes uses the term "fancy dress").

=== Specific rooms ===
A Dealer's or Huckster's Room is available, where merchants sell wares of interest to fans. These include books, action figures, prop replicas and t-shirts. Smaller conventions may simply have an informal Dealer's Row, a section of hotel rooms from which dealers sell goods, while larger conventions may have both an official dealer's room and an unofficial dealer's row.

Many conventions have video rooms, in which genre-related audiovisual presentations take place and/or films and trailers are shown.

=== Ending the event ===
Often the "Closing Ceremonies" on the convention's last day are dispensed with entirely. This omission is because such ceremonies would logically be held after scheduled events are over, and convention members are occupied with packing up and checking out of the hotel.

Ceremony or not, a dead dog party is likely to be held. This is the traditional winding-down party where few of the attendees are likely to have huge amounts of energy. This party is an attempt to ease people back into the real world outside of convention and can be an effective method of warding off the depression, which is often associated with the end of a major event. Analogies can be drawn to the decompression parties following large events such as Burning Man.

== Notable horror conventions ==
- Arcana
- Crypticon
- Fangoria's Weekend of Horrors
- Fantastic Fest
- For the Love of Horror
- Fright Night Film Fest
- Monster-Mania Con
- Monsterpalooza
- Rue Morgue Festival of Fear
- Spooky Empire
- Texas Frightmare Weekend
- World Horror Convention
