= Jacob G. Francis =

American author and historian

- Died: Lebanon, Pennsylvania, U.S.

Jacob Gottwals Francis, also known as J.G. or Jay G. (January 13, 1870 in Oaks, Pennsylvania – August 27, 1958) was an American author, a historian, a photographer, and a Church of the Brethren minister.

Francis was born in Oaks, Pennsylvania to John Umstead and Mary Jane (Gottwals) Francis. In 1891, he earned a Bachelor of Arts degree from Ursinus College He is credited with helping to found Elizabethtown College in 1899 located in Elizabethtown, Lancaster County, Pennsylvania. Francis, however, preferred other sites to Elizabethtown, and thus saw himself as the "instigator" of the college, rather than its founder, believing that the location of the college in Elizabethtown was in "violation of Brethren principles." In 1895, he was named minister of the Green Tree Church of the Brethren in Oaks, Pennsylvania. He was known for travelling throughout Pennsylvania and New Jersey on a bicycle.

Francis is joint author of a work of more than six hundred pages on the "History of the Brethren Church in the Eastern District of Pennsylvania" and author of the "History of the Brethren in Lebanon County."

On January 11, 1900, Francis married Mary Frantz Zug. They had six children: Mary Irene, Willard Zug, Monica, Michael Ulrich, Susanna Royer, and Anna Marthella.

He died in Detroit, Ohio. He is buried in Midway Cemetery in Lebanon County.
