= Wisp of a Thing =

2013 novel by Alex Bledsoe

- First edition cover
- Author: Alex Bledsoe
- Language: English
- Series: Tufa
- Genre: Urban fantasy
- Publisher: Tor Books
- Publication date: June 2013
- Publication place: United States
- Media type: Hardback
- Pages: 351
- ISBN: 978-0-7653-3413-8
- Preceded by: The Hum and the Shiver
- Followed by: Long Black Curl

Wisp of a Thing is an urban fantasy novel by American writer Alex Bledsoe, first published in the United States in June 2013 by Tor Books. It is the second in a series of six books by Bledsoe about the Tufa living in a remote Appalachian valley in East Tennessee. The Tufa are descendants of Irish fairies and were found in the area when the first European settlers arrived.

Wisp of a Thing received positive reviews from critics, and won the 2014 Audie Award for best fantasy audiobook, narrated by Stefan Rudnicki. The book's name was taken from the title of a song by South Carolina singer-songwriter Jennifer Goree.

== Development ==
Bledsoe stated that he began working on Wisp of a Thing in the early 2000s, and that the initial drafts were written before the first book in the Tufa series, The Hum and the Shiver. It was in these early drafts that he created the Tufa universe, its rules and the characters. But Bledsoe found that Wisp of a Thing "never quite worked well enough to sell", and he set about writing another Tufa book set the same universe. This became The Hum and the Shiver and was published in 2011. When Bledsoe's publisher asked for a sequel, he began rewriting Wisp of a Thing and produced a novel that was very different from the pre-Hum and Shiver versions, particularly regarding the featured characters. Bledsoe remarked that, "changing a prequel into a sequel is actually more work than writing a new book from scratch."

== Plot introduction ==
Musician Rob Quillen is devastated at the loss of his girlfriend in a plane crash. A stranger suggests that he visit Cloud County where he will find a song to ease his pain. There Rob finds the mysterious Tufa and their extraordinary music. He soon becomes embroiled in Tufa feuds and discovers that, even though he has no Tufa blood, he has inherited some of their magical abilities.

== Critical reception ==
Canadian fantasy writer Charles de Lint said Wisp of a Thing "is that perfect sequel ... that stands entirely on its own." In a review in The Magazine of Fantasy & Science Fiction he described the characters as "sympathetic and believable", and called the book "the real deal" in terms of North American fantasy. de Lint compared the Tufa books to Manly Wade Wellman's Silver John series, saying that they share a "thematic lineage ... music and the mountains – and the magic in both". He liked the way Bledsoe's series "embrac[es] a true North American mythology", and feels like they have been "[a] part of the folkloric lexicon forever".

Writing in The Booklist, David Pitt called Wisp of a Thing "[a] chilling mix of fantasy, realism, and a touch of horror". He described it as "a very subtle book" that drops a "slow accumulation of tantalizing hints" of something developing beneath the surface. A review in Publishers Weekly stated that Bledsoe's novel has "strong characterization and a passionate love of music" and "brings a real warmth ... to [this] modern-day fairy story". It opined that Wisp of a Thing "feels more heartfelt and is written with a lighter touch" than its predecessor, The Hum and the Shiver. Kirkus Reviews described the novel as a "beautifully handled drama of Appalachian music and magic". The review stated that as in Bledsoe's previous book, Wisp of a Thing has "fascinating characters, a persuasive setting and intriguing complications".

Reviewing Wisp of a Thing in Knox News, Emily Choate wrote that the novel has some "very dark moments", including some "ugly caricature[s]" of a few of the female characters. However, she stated that Bledsoe is careful to balance bleakness with uplifting moments, and avoids being overly sentimental by "continually offering up surprises, imbuing even the most violent passages with empathy and, sometimes, whimsy". Choate said that this "sleight of hand is what ultimately makes Wisp of a Thing a satisfying read." In a review published in Locus, Faren Miller wrote that Wisp of a Thing has the same "hybrid mystery/fantasy" elements that Bledsoe used successfully in his Eddie LaCrosse series. Miller said that he has merged "the rogue spirits" of contemporary Southern country music and fantasy, and created "a thoroughly compelling tale."

== Works cited ==
- Bledsoe, Alex (2013). Wisp of a Thing. Tor Books. ISBN 978-0-7653-3413-8.
