= Holiday Matsuri =

Annual convention in Orlando, Florida

- Status: Active
- Genre: Multi-genre
- Frequency: Annual
- Location: Orlando, Florida
- Country: United States
- Inaugurated: December 2011; 14 years ago
- Website: https://www.holidaymatsuri.com/

Holiday Matsuri, or HolMat, is an American multigenre convention that caters primarily to the anime, video gaming, science fiction, and cosplay communities. The convention, which bills itself as a "festively themed" seasonal event, has been held annually in Orlando, Florida, since December 2011. Holiday-themed events that have taken place at the convention include a Holiday Runway Contest, a Holiday Rave, and a Winter Cosplay Crown Contest.

== History ==
The first Holiday Matsuri convention was held at a DoubleTree Hotel managed by Hilton Worldwide in Orlando, Florida, from December 16–18, 2011. The convention also served as a charity event, donating a portion of its profits to Toys for Tots, and hosting a Toys for Tots Benefit Ball wherein attendees could receive admission by donating toys.

The second convention, held from December 14–16, 2012, took place at an Embassy Suites by Hilton hotel in Orlando. The third annual convention took place at the same location from December 13–15, 2013. The fourth annual convention was held at the Caribe Royale in Orlando from December 12–14, 2014. The fifth annual convention again took place at the Caribe Royale, from December 18–20, 2015. The sixth annual convention was held at the Orlando World Center Marriott in December 2016.

The Orlando World Center Marriott again served as the venue for Holiday Matsuri at the convention's seventh annual event, which took place from December 15–17, 2017, as well as its eighth event, which took place from December 14–16, 2018, and its ninth event, held from December 13–15, 2019.

The 2020 Holiday Matsuri convention, which was intended as a celebration of the convention's 10th anniversary, was cancelled as a result of the COVID-19 pandemic. The convention celebrated its 10th anniversary on December 17–19, 2021, at the Orlando World Center Marriott.

== Event history ==
Dates	Venue	Location	Atten.	Guests
December 16-18, 2011	Doubletree Orlando Hotel at the Entrance to Universal Orlando	Orlando, Florida		American Whammy Productions, AniRage, Amelie Belche, Console Alliance, Alexis Cruz, JoEllen Elam, Traci Hines, Brittney Karbowski, Aya Knight, Scott McNeil, Nexus Gaming Alliance, PikaBelleChu, Chii Sakurabi, Steampunk Funk, Sonny Strait, Chuck Stroschein, and Brad Swaile
December 14-16, 2012	Embassy Suites Orlando - Lake Buena Vista South	Kissimmee, Florida		AniRage, Richie Branson, Chalk Twins, D.C. Douglas, Quinton Flynn, The Gekkos, Todd Haberkorn, Yaya Han, Traci Hines, NeoFaust, Nexus Gaming Alliance, PikaBelleChu, S.S. Hanami, Chii Sakurabi, Shadowfax, J. Michael Tatum
December 13-15, 2013	Embassy Suites Orlando - Lake Buena Vista South	Kissimmee, Florida		AniRage, Richie Branson, Chalk Twins, Jaxon, Nexus Gaming Alliance, PikaBelleChu, Pleasure Pixels, Christopher Sabat, Chii Sakurabi, Sean Schemmel, J. Michael Tatum, Cristina Vee
December 12-14, 2014	Caribe Royale All-Suite Hotel & Convention Center	Orlando, Florida		Chalk Twins, George Lowe, Amie Lynn, Matthew Mercer, Chii Sakurabi, J. Michael Tatum, Liz Victory
December 18-20, 2015	Caribe Royale All-Suite Hotel & Convention Center	Orlando, Florida		Chalk Twins, Grey DeLisle Griffin, Todd Haberkorn, Hunter "Dookieshed" Hughes, NateWantsToBattle, Nexus Gaming Alliance, Sean Schemmel, Joshua Seth, Shadowfax, Liz Victory
December 16-18, 2016	Orlando World Center Marriott	Orlando, Florida		Steve Blum, Todd Haberkorn, Hunter "Dookieshed" Hughes, Mary Elizabeth McGlynn, NateWantsToBattle, Noise Complaint, Pleasure Pixels, Indra Rojas, Liz Victory
December 15-17, 2017	Orlando World Center Marriott	Orlando, Florida		Kay Bear, Chalk Twins, Leon Chiro, Charlet Chung, Cosplay Deviants, Geekapella, Kristen Hughey, Brandon McInnis, NateWantsToBattle, Pleasure Pixels, Indra Rojas, Alyson Tabbitha, Fred Tatasciore, J. Michael Tatum, Cristina Vee, Liz Victory
December 14-16, 2018	Orlando World Center Marriott	Orlando, Florida		Zach Callison, Chalk Twins, Leon Chiro, Jen Cohn, Cosplay Deviants, Todd Haberkorn, Jennifer Hale, Yaya Han, Brittney Karbowski, Kaye Cosplay, Phil Mizuno, NateWantsToBattle, Lucie Pohl, Keith Silverstein, W.T. Snacks, Alyson Tabbitha
December 13-15, 2019	Orlando World Center Marriott	Orlando, Florida		Akidearest, Ray Chase, Leah Clark, Cynthia Cranz, CRH Productions, Robbie Daymond, Yaya Han, Brandon McInnis, Max Mittelman, Phil Mizuno, Nexus Gaming Alliance, Wendy Powell, J. Michael Tatum, Diana Tolin
December 18-20, 2020	Cancelled due to the COVID-19 pandemic in Florida			
December 17-19, 2021	Orlando World Center Marriott	Orlando, Florida		Poonam Basu, Griffin Burns, Chalk Twins, Tiffany Gordon, Yaya Han, Brandon McInnis, Xander Mobus, Lucie Pohl Pros and Cons Cosplay, Maggie Robertson, Evil Ted Smith, J. Michael Tatum
December 16-18, 2022	Orlando World Center Marriott	Orlando, Florida		Akidearest, Kira Buckland, Griffin Burns, Chalk Twins, Beverly Downen, Brett Downen, Chris "Papa Bear" English, Ricco Fajardo, Dorah Fine, Yaya Han, Erika Harlacher, Chad Hoku, Kirilee, Jamie Marchi, Amanda C. Miller, Daman Mills, Phil Mizuno, Xander Mobus, Tony Oliver, Pros and Cons Cosplay, Keith Silverstein, Ciarán Strange, Kit Strange, Alyson Tabbitha, Teca, Liz Victory
December 20-22, 2023	Orlando World Center Marriott	Orlando, Florida		Karan Ashley, Awesomus Prime, Dante Basco, Dani Chambers, Jen Cohn, Cowbutt Crunchies, Dorah Fine, Yaya Han, Chad Hoku, Amanda "AmaLee" Lee, Erica Lindbeck, Brandon McInnis, Alejandro Saab, Alyson Tabbitha, J. Michael Tatum, Jonathan Wheeler, Michael "Knightmage" Wilson
December 20-22, 2024	Orange County Convention Center; Hyatt Regency Orlando	Orlando, Florida		
December 19-21, 2025	Orange County Convention Center; Hyatt Regency Orlando	Orlando, Florida		
December 18-20, 2026	Orange County Convention Center; Hyatt Regency Orlando	Orlando, Florida		
