= Spooky Empire =

American multigenre convention

- Status: Active
- Genre: Horror, multi-genre
- Frequency: Bi-annual
- Location: Florida
- Country: United States
- Inaugurated: 2003; 23 years ago
- Attendance: Around 33,000 in October 2018
- Website: http://spookyempire.com/

Spooky Empire is an American multigenre convention focused primarily on horror and science fiction, held bi-annually in Florida. The convention, which is billed as "the dark side of Comic-Con", features vendors, a film and tattoo festival, music, and celebrity guests.

== History ==
Co-founded by Peter Mongelli and Blaine Kimball, Spooky Empire has been held in Florida since 2003. It is held twice a year, in the spring and in the autumn. The first event took place at a Holiday Inn in Broward County, Florida. The convention was held in Orlando, Florida from 2006 to 2019, before moving to Tampa, Florida for its autumn 2019 event due to a lack of sufficient available venue space in Orlando.

Celebrity guests at Spooky Empire have included Gillian Anderson, Fairuza Balk, Bruce Campbell, Neve Campbell, Alice Cooper, David Duchovny, Gunnar Hansen, Kane Hodder, Christopher Lloyd, Malcolm McDowell, Bill Moseley, Cassandra Peterson, Sam Raimi, Burt Reynolds, Christina Ricci, George A. Romero, Felissa Rose, Lewis Teague, Henry Thomas, Danny Trejo, Dee Wallace, and Carl Weathers.
