= Caballeros de Montevideo =

Non-profit organisation in Uruguay

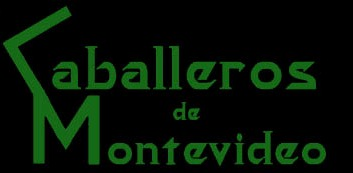
Caballeros de Montevideo logo

Caballeros de Montevideo (Knights of Montevideo), is a non-profit organization in Uruguay which holds events to promote role-playing games and gather donations for charity causes. It was founded in 2002, and continues to hold at least three annual events, as well as participating in fan events held by other organizations.

== See also ==
- Montevideo Comics, Uruguay's first comic book (and related activities) convention.
- Continuará..., Uruguayan costume, comics, and other related activities event.
