= Schuylkill River Passenger Rail =

Proposed Amtrak service

Overview
- Service type: Inter-city rail
- Status: Proposed
- Locale: Pennsylvania
- Website: gosrpra.com

Route
- Termini: Philadelphia; Reading

Technical
- Track gauge: 4 ft 8 1/2 in (1,435 mm) standard gauge

Schuylkill River Passenger Rail is a proposed passenger train service along the Schuylkill River between Philadelphia and Reading, Pennsylvania, with intermediate stops in Norristown, King of Prussia, Phoenixville, and Pottstown. The project is headed by the Schuylkill River Passenger Rail Authority (SRPRA).

Passenger trains previously ran on this route from 1838 to 1981, when SEPTA discontinued service past Norristown on what is now known as the Manayunk/Norristown Line. Since then, various proposals have been made to restore full service to Reading.

Interest around the route has grown in the 2020s. In 2021 Amtrak included the route in its 2035 expansion vision. In 2022 county governments formed the Schuylkill River Passenger Rail Authority to further the development of the project. In 2023 the Federal Railroad Administration accepted the route into its Corridor Identification and Development Program, which allocates money for planning and prioritizes the project for future funding.

== History ==
=== Prior service ===
The Philadelphia, Germantown and Norristown Railroad and the Philadelphia and Reading Railway Company built the first rail line between Philadelphia and Reading in the 1830s. This became the Main Line of the Reading Company. The Pennsylvania Railroad (PRR) built the competing Schuylkill Branch along a parallel route in the 1880s. In 1930, the PRR electrified the portion of its line between Philadelphia and Norristown. The Reading Company did the same in 1933.

The City of Philadelphia and suburban counties began providing public funds under contract with the PRR and Reading Company for continuation and improvement of regional rail service. Because the Reading's Norristown line was considered the stronger of the two, PRR service was cut back to Manayunk in 1960.

Conrail assumed operations of both lines in April 1976, resulting in all freight activity shifting to the former Reading Main Line. Commuter service on the former PRR line was extended from Manayunk to Ivy Ridge station in order to serve a new park-and-ride lot. Service to Reading used electric multiple-unit cars between Philadelphia's Reading Terminal and Norristown, and diesel-electric "push-pull" cars from Norristown to Reading. This operation continued until SEPTA ceased funding for the diesel section in 1981, two years prior to taking direct control of Philadelphia's commuter rail routes from Conrail. In 1986 service on the former PRR line was cut back from Ivy Ridge to Cynwyd station in Lower Merion Township.

=== Schuylkill Valley Metro ===
From 2000 to 2002, the Delaware Valley Regional Planning Commission, SEPTA, and other regional stakeholders studied the possible return of passenger rail service between Philadelphia and Reading, a project known as the Schuylkill Valley Metro (SVM).

The SVM would use both sides of the former SEPTA R6 lines; the former PRR Schuylkill Branch between Suburban Station and Ivy Ridge (Cynwyd Line), and the former Reading's main line between Jefferson Station and Norristown (Manayunk/Norristown Line), before merging on the old Reading Main Line (now Norfolk Southern's Harrisburg Line) west of the current Norristown station. A new spur, called the Cross-County Segment, would split off at Port Kennedy (near Valley Forge), and would allow SVM trains to access King of Prussia, Pennsylvania, and the Great Valley Corporate Center in Malvern, Pennsylvania, using the former PRR/Penn Central Trenton Cutoff (now Norfolk Southern's Dale Secondary) used by the former PRR as a freight-only bypass around Philadelphia, although an alternative would be to have the Cross-County segment serve only King of Prussia with SEPTA extending the existing Norristown High-Speed Line to King of Prussia, via the Trenton Cutoff.

Unlike the RDG trains, the new SVM would be entirely electric, with power being supplied by Amtrak, SEPTA, and (between Norristown and Reading) the Exelon Corporation, the successor company to the former Philadelphia Electric Company, later PECO Energy. Existing catenary wires, powered at 12 kV, 25 Hz AC, would be used on the old lines, with new high-tension catenary poles, powered at 25 kV, 60 Hz AC, and similar to the system utilized on the Northeast Corridor north of New Haven, Connecticut, would be employed west of Norristown.

Planners intended to operate trains at 15-minute intervals during peak travel times, Mondays to Fridays, and at 30-minute intervals at all other times. Norfolk Southern Railway trains would have been able to use most of the system at all hours, but would have been restricted to overnight movements at some locations after SVM ceased operations at night between Midnight and 6 a.m.

In August 2006, Pennsylvania Governor Edward Rendell announced that funding for the SVM project would not be forthcoming and that it should be considered dead. In December 2007, Montgomery County authorized an unsuccessful study that looked at possible new funding sources. Congressman Jim Gerlach announced in April 2011 that the results from that Montgomery County study would be soon published.

=== Greenline ===
Another approach, known as the Greenline, proposed serving the towns of Oaks and Phoenixville via a new connection at the current Paoli/Thorndale Line at Paoli Station. This project was cancelled when funding could not be obtained.

=== Norristown Extension ===
After the Schuylkill Valley Metro plan was rejected by FTA, the Montgomery County Planning Commission initiated the R6 Extension Study (later called the Norristown Extension) as an alternative approach. Unlike the SVM, the R6 Extension Study would only see electrification extended as far as King of Prussia (with SEPTA extending the Norristown High Speed Service) and no major reconstruction of any platforms. Any service west of King of Prussia would require new construction and the purchasing of extra push-pull consists hauled by dual-mode locomotives. Funding for the R6 Extension Study was to be provided by revenue earned via a proposed plan to toll U.S. Route 422 between Pottstown and King of Prussia. The tolling idea, suggested by the Delaware Valley Regional Planning Commission (DVRPC), was lambasted by several regional politicians, most notably Pennsylvania House of Representatives member Mike Vereb. Vereb and the influential passenger rail advocacy group Pennsylvania Transit Expansion Coalition jointly appeared at a DVRPC open forum on September 13, 2011, where DVRPC Executive Director Barry Seymour was presenting. On October 5, 2011, under increasing pressure and opposition, DVRPC cancelled the tolling proposal and plans for the Norristown Extension.

=== Recent efforts ===
In mid-2018, the borough of Phoenixville began a study to restore SEPTA passenger rail service between Norristown and Phoenixville along Norfolk Southern freight railroad tracks. In 2018, The Berks Alliance commissioned a study on the restoration of Passenger Rail service between Reading and Philadelphia. This study indicated that there was sufficient ridership to make the service economically viable. The proposed extension would utilize existing Norfolk Southern freight railroad tracks. Some improvements may be required, but most of the line could handle passenger rail service at a maximum speed of 70 mph (110 km/h). Before service can be implemented, a study would need to take place.

In 2020, the Pennsylvania Department of Transportation inspired by the work in Phoenixville and Reading created its own plan about the feasibility of extending passenger train service from Norristown to Reading along the Norfolk Southern freight line. The Berks Alliance report projected that proposed extension would cost $365 million, which includes buying the trains and paying Norfolk Southern to use the line, with an annual operating cost of $20 million. The PennDOT study projected a higher cost of around $800 million. Inclusion of this expansion in the State Rail Plan was important for the initiative to receive federal funding from the Federal Rail Authority. Amtrak has subsequently included this project in its plans, which in turn is also helpful for discussions with Norfolk Southern and the FRA.

Stations would be located in Reading, Pottstown, Royersford, Phoenixville, and Norristown; from where the train will follow the existing Manayunk/Norristown Line to Philadelphia.

Rail service between Reading and Philadelphia along the Norfolk Southern line is included in Amtrak's service vision for 2035. In August 2021, Amtrak revealed their plan for train service from Reading to Philadelphia and New York City. Train service would follow the Norfolk Southern line between Reading and Philadelphia and Amtrak's Northeast Corridor between Philadelphia and New York City. Station stops will be located in Reading, Pottstown, Phoenixville, King of Prussia, Norristown, Philadelphia (30th Street Station), North Philadelphia, Cornwells Heights, Trenton, Princeton Junction, New Brunswick, Metropark, Newark Airport, Newark (Penn Station), and New York City (Penn Station). Service would include three daily roundtrips and travel time would take 1 hour and 37 minutes between Reading and Philadelphia and 2 hours and 55 minutes between Reading and New York City. In 2022, Amtrak announced plans for an Amtrak Thruway express bus route between Franklin Street in Reading and 30th Street Station in Philadelphia, with an intermediate stop at Pottstown, to test if there is enough ridership for rail service. The service will be operated by a private bus company and will run for two years. On June 6, 2022, the Amtrak Thruway bus connecting Philadelphia to Reading via Pottstown began service. The service, which is operated by Krapf Coaches, consists of two daily round trips. Stops are located at 30th Street Station in Philadelphia, the Charles W. Dickinson Transportation Center in Pottstown, and the BARTA Transportation Center in Reading. The Amtrak Thruway bus between Philadelphia and Reading will be discontinued effective March 18, 2025, due to low ridership. Despite this, Amtrak still remains committed to establishing rail service between the two cities.

In May 2022, Berks, Chester, and Montgomery counties formed the Schuylkill River Passenger Rail Authority for the purpose of furthering the project. The authority's first meeting was held in July 2022. The Rail Authority applied to the Corridor Identification and Development Program, the mechanism for the Federal Railroad Administration to develop new train routes funded by the Infrastructure Investment and Jobs Act. The route was accepted by the FRA in December 2023, granting $500,000 toward route development and prioritizing the project for future federal funding.

==== Proposed stations ====
Location	Station	Date opened	Connections / notes
Philadelphia	30th Street Station	1933	
Phoenixville	Phoenixville	1865	
Pottstown	Pottstown	1928	
Reading	Franklin Street	1870	
