= Chapel of Ease (novel) =

2016 novel by Alex Bledsoe

- First edition cover
- Author: Alex Bledsoe
- Language: English
- Series: Tufa
- Genre: Urban fantasy
- Publisher: Tor Books
- Publication date: September 2016
- Publication place: United States
- Media type: Hardback
- Pages: 315
- ISBN: 978-0-7653-7656-5
- Preceded by: Long Black Curl
- Followed by: Gather Her Round

Chapel of Ease is an urban fantasy novel by American writer Alex Bledsoe, first published in the United States in September 2016 by Tor Books. It is the fourth in a series of six books by Bledsoe about the Tufa living in a remote Appalachian valley in East Tennessee. The Tufa are descendants of Irish fairies and were found in the area when the first European settlers arrived.

Chapel of Ease generally received positive reviews from critics. The book's name was taken from the title of a song by South Carolina singer-songwriter Jennifer Goree.

== Plot introduction ==
Matt Johansson is a gay New York City actor who lands a part in Chapel of Ease, a musical written by playwright Ray Parrish. But Ray dies on the play's opening night, and Matt, who had befriended Ray, decides to visit the chapel on which the play is based in the dramatist's hometown in Cloud County. There Matt encounters the mysterious Tufa and becomes embroiled in Ray's Tufa heritage.

== Critical reception ==
In a review in Fantasy Literature, Kat Hooper called Chapel of Ease a "character-driven romance", and said Bledsoe's decision to feature homosexual relationships should please many readers. She remarked that the novel has the same "eerie atmosphere" as the previous books in the Tufa series, and its "run-down close-minded Appalachian town" has an air of "squalidness, despondency, and desperate menace". Hooper's only "minor quibble" about the story were inconsistencies in the Tufa's attitude to homosexuality: initially they appeared intolerant, yet later they came across as being more accepting. Hooper gave the novel three-and-a-half stars out of five.

Debbi Bachman wrote at Talk Nerdy with Us that the Chapel of Ease's characters are "so well fleshed out" that "they ... feel like friends you’ve known for a lifetime". She said that this is a book to enjoy relaxing on your porch and imagining "that you too are in the hills". A review in Publishers Weekly stated that Chapel of Ease "skillfully fuses music, legend, and regional atmosphere to create something that feels like an unexplored corner of American mythology." Kirkus Reviews, however, complained that Chapel of Ease does not continue to explore the nature of the Tufa as Bledsoe did in the previous books in the series. The reviewer also felt that the author tended to overplay the mystery of chapel.

== Works cited ==
- Bledsoe, Alex (2016). Chapel of Ease. Tor Books. ISBN 978-0-7653-7656-5.
