= The Hum and the Shiver =

2011 novel by Alex Bledsoe

- First edition cover
- Author: Alex Bledsoe
- Language: English
- Series: Tufa
- Genre: Urban fantasy
- Publisher: Tor Books
- Publication date: September 2011
- Publication place: United States
- Media type: Trade paperback
- Pages: 304
- ISBN: 978-0-7653-2744-4
- Followed by: Wisp of a Thing

The Hum and the Shiver is an urban fantasy novel by American writer Alex Bledsoe, first published in the United States in September 2011 by Tor Books. It is the first in a series of six books by Bledsoe about the Tufa living in a remote Appalachian valley in East Tennessee. The Tufa are descendants of Irish fairies and were found in the area when the first European settlers arrived.

Bledsoe dedicated The Hum and the Shiver to South Carolina singer-songwriter Jennifer Goree, "for the title and the music". The book's title comes from the title of Goree's third album, The Hum and the Shiver and its eponymous lead song.

The Hum and the Shiver received mostly positive reviews from critics, and was selected by Kirkus Reviews as one of its best works of fiction in 2011.

== Development ==
Bledsoe said in an interview in 2017 that the idea for the Tufa came from his father. He had told Bledsoe stories of people living in the north Tennessee mountains long before the first Europeans arrived. While these tales were folklore, the notion of a group of people nobody knew where they came from stayed with Bledsoe for thirty years before he turned it into his Tufa series. Another source of inspiration for the Tufa came from the Melungeons, groups of dark-skinned people of unknown ancestry found in central Appalachia. When Jessica Lynch, an American soldier was rescued during the 2003 invasion of Iraq, Bledsoe wondered what if she had belonged to a clan like the Melungeons. This fictitious Lynch became private Bronwyn Hyatt, the heroine in The Hum and the Shiver.

Bledsoe explained that these stories of people of unknown origin and the Tufa tales both draw on the "fear of otherness that drives so much southern culture". He stated that the underlying theme of the Tufa books is "when it's no longer possible to hide from the world, how do you make your peace with it?" Bledsoe derived the Tufa's name from the Tuatha Dé Danann, a race of fairy-like beings in Irish mythology. The third book in the Tufa series, Long Black Curl explains that the Tufa had been exiled from Faerie by the Fairy Queen using a curse that sent them west across the ocean.

Bledsoe emphasized the importance of songs to the Tufa, saying that they "manifest their faerie magic via music, and use its power to influence the world at large". The song lyrics used in the books were sourced from traditional ballads and music written by independent musicians. Where Bledsoe could not find a song for a passage of text, he wrote the lyrics himself, but without the accompanying music.

South Carolina singer-songwriter Jennifer Goree played an important part in the development of the Tufa stories. Bledsoe was impressed by Goree's music and said "[i]f the Tufa have a voice, it belongs to Jennifer Goree." He used the title of her third album and its lead song for The Hum and the Shiver's book title, and named all the subsequent Tufa novels after Goree's songs.

== Plot introduction ==
US Army Private Bronwyn Hyatt returns home after being wounded during the 2003 invasion of Iraq. She is Tufa and lives in a remote Appalachian valley in East Tennessee with her extended family. Dark-haired, dark-skinned and enigmatic, the Tufa are said to be descendants of Irish fairies and have lived in the area long before the first European settlers arrived. Music is an essential part of Tufa culture and songs are passed down from mother to daughter. Music empowers the Tufa with magical abilities, including healing, flying and the ability to communicate with haints.

Bronwyn quickly recovers from her injuries, but has disturbing visits by a haint. She also discovers that her mother, Chloe is plagued by death omens. Dwayne Gitterman, Bronwyn's former abusive boyfriend, begins stalking and harassing her again. Bronwyn joined the army to escape Dwayne. The Tufa have split into two factions, Bronwyn's group, led by Mandalay Harris of the First Daughters, and Dwayne's group led by Rockhouse Hicks. The First Daughters have preserved Tufa culture and can practise magic, while Hicks' group have forsaken their roots and lost their magical abilities.

The Tufa's contact with the outside world has increased over the years, and intermarrying has taken place. Don Swayback's great-grandmother was Tufa, and he has some Tufa blood in him. He is a reporter and is tasked with interviewing Bronwyn, but when he makes contact with the Tufa, he discovers that he more Tufa than he realized. Craig Chess is a Methodist preacher. He has no Tufa blood, but becomes fascinated with the mysterious community and forms a relationship with Bronwyn.

== Critical reception ==
In a review published in Locus, Faren Miller wrote that The Hum and the Shiver has its own "special take on fantasy", featuring an enigmatic and ancient clan, and one of their own returning home wounded after fighting for America in the Iraq War. He added that the death-omens that stalk the Tufa also make the book "a kind of murder mystery where no one has yet died." Miller said Bledsoe "captures that strangeness in its splendid title", and has produced "a strong tale" with characters "(re)discover[ing] their own essential strangeness".

Canadian fantasy writer Charles de Lint described The Hum and the Shiver as "an absolute treasure". In a review in The Magazine of Fantasy & Science Fiction he said Bledsoe's prose is "plainspoken and lyric". The characters are strong and the story's magic manifestations are "subtle even as they soar". de Lint concluded: "If I read a better book this year it's going to be a very good year for reading."

Kirkus Reviews called the novel "[a] sheer delight". The review opined that it as a "powerful, character-driven drama" written in "superbly lucid prose" and "an utterly convincing backdrop". A review in Publishers Weekly stated that while the book's plot "is a bit thin ... the slowly unfolding mystery of the Tufa is a fascinating and absorbing masterpiece of world-building." A reviewer in the Seattle Post-Intelligencer wrote that "Alex Bledsoe shows an appreciation for a life of music I've rarely seen in fiction". They said the novel "weaves the magic of ancient songs and lyrics seamlessly into a world both touched and untouched by modern sensibilities and dangers", adding that its prose is "nearly poetic" and reveals "secrets ancient and wild".

North Carolina English and linguistics academic Kathy Lyday was more critical of The Hum and the Shiver. Writing in the Appalachian Journal she complained of Bledsoe's depictions of rural East Tennessee communities, particularly the Melungeons and their descendants. She said that while the Melungeons are not mentioned by name in the book, "readers should make no mistake that the Tufa ... is meant to represent this ... mountain community." Lyday criticized the "one-dimensional characters", saying that there are too many for a book of this length to be developed enough to paint a clear picture of the Tufa. She also complained that the story is full of "stereotypes, misinformation, bad humor, and gratuitous sex". Lyday concluded, "I wanted to like this book because I enjoy a good fantasy read, but not at the expense of real people and history." She wondered "what the Melungeon community will think of this nonsense."

== Works cited ==
- Bledsoe, Alex (2011a). The Hum and the Shiver. Tor Books. ISBN 978-0-7653-2744-4.
