= The Fairies of Sadieville =

2018 novel by Alex Bledsoe

- First edition cover
- Author: Alex Bledsoe
- Language: English
- Series: Tufa
- Genre: Urban fantasy
- Publisher: Tor Books
- Publication date: April 2018
- Publication place: United States
- Media type: Hardback
- Pages: 367
- ISBN: 978-0-7653-8336-5
- Preceded by: Gather Her Round

The Fairies of Sadieville is an urban fantasy novel by American writer Alex Bledsoe, first published in the United States in April 2018 by Tor Books. It is the last in a series of six books by Bledsoe about the Tufa living in a remote Appalachian valley in East Tennessee. The Tufa are descendants of Irish fairies and were found in the area when the first European settlers arrived.

The Fairies of Sadieville generally received positive reviews from critics. The book's name was derived from "Sadieville", the title of a song by South Carolina singer-songwriter Jennifer Goree that was released on Dont Be a Stranger, her 1998 album with Appalachian Soul.

Bledsoe stated that The Fairies of Sadieville is the final Tufa book. He said:

It’s not that I don’t have more ideas; rather, the ideas I have don’t go anywhere new. If I did continue, there’s the danger I might start repeating myself out of desperation, or laziness, or both. What I’ve tried to make compelling and unique might degenerate into soap opera. What I’d hoped was magical and delicate might become trite and obvious. So I’ve decided to end it now with a story that fills in a lot of the blanks I’ve hinted at in the prior books, and in the process wraps up the various subplots running throughout the series.

== Plot introduction ==
Graduate students, Justin and Veronica find a century-old silent film showing what appears to be a girl transforming into a fairy. It took place in Sadieville, a mining town in Tennessee. The pair visit Needsville in Cloud County to investigate. They discover that in 1915 Sadieville disappeared when a cavern beneath it collapsed. This leads the pair to uncovering a long-forgotten cave with a portal to Tír na nÓg. The Tufa realize they have an opportunity to return to their homeland from where they were exiled thousands of years ago, but are conflicted over whether to leave their new home in the Appalachian mountains or not.

== Critical reception ==
Canadian fantasy writer Charles de Lint called The Fairies of Sadieville a fitting end to an "absolutely enchanting series". He said Bledsoe has delivered "a true North American fantasy" that draws on the people and folklore of Appalachia. de Lint stated, "I can't think of any other writer who has created a body of work that merges mythic matter, the rural experience, and the modern world as successfully as Bledsoe has with this bittersweet series. The Tufa books have set a new bar for what readers will expect from a North American fantasy experience."

LaShawn M. Wanak liked the book's sensitive handling of relationships and the introduction of a mixed couple, Justin and Veronica, to the Tufa series. In a review in Lightspeed magazine, she found Justin's interaction as a black man with white Southerners interesting, and noted Bledsoe's acknowledgement of African-American roots in bluegrass. Reading how the Tufa agonized over the possibility of returning to their homeland fascinated Wanak, although she did feel that the book may have dwelt a little too excessively on each Tufa's reactions to the news.

A review of The Fairies of Sadieville in Publishers Weekly stated that, as in the previous Tufa books, "Bledsoe infuses his setting with a rich sense of location, atmosphere, and history". The reviewer said the discussions on race in the South are "thought-provoking", but felt that the book's ending came across as "a little unfinished".

Liz Bourke wrote in a review at Tor.com that while Bledsoe's text "is [always] carefully precise", "elegantly measured" and "a delight to read", she felt that The Fairies of Sadieville is "more scattered and less unified" than the previous books in the series. Bourke opined that the book is "lacking ... depth", and that "[i]ts strands are woven together without the deftness of connection ... [needed] ... to support each other for the maximum tension or strength of feeling." She expected more from the final volume of the excellent Tufa series.

== Works cited ==
- Bledsoe, Alex (2018). The Fairies of Sadieville. Tor Books. ISBN 978-0-7653-8336-5.
