= London Super Comic Convention =

Annual comic convention in London, England

- Status: Merged with MCM London Comic Con
- Genre: Comics
- Venue: ExCeL London (2012–2016); Business Design Centre (2017)
- Location: London
- Country: England
- Inaugurated: 2012
- Founders: I. Ahmet, G. Panayiotou, John S.
- Most recent: 2017
- Attendance: 25,000 (2015)
- Organizer: G. Morris
- Website: londonsupercomicconvention.com

London Super Comic Convention was an annual comic book convention dedicated to comics that was mounted from 2012 to 2017.

In its inaugural year 2012, Stan Lee was its main guest. It has since drawn in the likes of J. Scott Campbell, Neal Adams, George Pérez, Dave Gibbons, Dan Slott, Charlie Adlard, Max Brooks and Jonathan Ross.

Dealers from across the UK and USA came to sell their products and promote their businesses. There was also a large small press section and an active cosplay contingent, culminating with the LSCC London Super Costume Championship, judged by special guests.

The London Super Comic Convention mounted conventions from 2012 to 2017. After not mounting a show in 2018, the convention announced in March 2019 that it had merged forces with Reed Exhibitions and the MCM London Comic Con, thus bringing the LSCC to a close.

== Location and dates ==
Dates	Location	Publishers	Guests
25 and 26 February 2012	ExCeL London	2000AD, Atlas Comics, IDW, Markosia Enterprises, Panini Comics	Stan Lee, Dan Slott, George Pérez, Emanuela Lupacchino, Brian Bolland, Kieron Gillen, Simon Furman, Jamal Igle, Al Davison, Andrew Wildman, Andy Lanning, Bernie Wrightson, Bob Layton, David Hine, David Petersen, Duncan Fegredo, Eric Basaldua, Fred Van Lente, Guillermo Ortego, Howard Chaykin, Ian Churchill, J.K. Woodward, Jamie Mckelvie, Jim Cheung, Jock, John McCrea, Mike Deodato Jr., Mike Norton, Neil Edwards, Nick Percival, Paul Cornell, Peter Nguyen, Phil Jimenez, Sean Phillips, Simon Bisley, Steve Epting, Tony Lee, Victor Drujiniu
23 and 24 February 2013	ExCeL London	2000AD, arcana, Avatar Press, Markosia Enterprises, UK Comics & UK on Display, Top Cow, Zenescope Entertainment	J. Scott Campbell, Neal Adams, Herb Trimpe, Mark Buckingham, Klaus Janson, Roy Thomas, Gary Erskine, Matteo Scalera, Bill Sienkiewicz, David W. Mack, David Finch (comics), Gabriele Dell'Otto, Yildiray Cinar, Lee Bermejo, Simone Bianchi (artist)
15 and 16 March 2014	ExCeL London	2000AD, Archaia Entertainment, Avatar Press, Boom! Studios, IDW, Markosia Enterprises, Panini Comics, Titan Comics, Zenescope Entertainment	Peter David, Dave Gibbons, Peter Milligan, Jonathan Ross, Ethan Van Sciver, Michael Dialynas, Ian Edginton, Robin Furth, Mike Grell, Gianluca Gugliotta, Peter Hogan, David Lloyd, Paolo Pantelena, Marco Santucci, Steve Scott, Mark Texeira, Billy Tucci, Max Brooks, Jacen Burrows, Neil Edwards, Lee Garbett, Andy Lanning, Yanick Paquette, Jamie Tyndall, John Watson, JK Woodward, Chrissie Zullo, Ian Churchill, Katie Cook, Alan Davis, Mark Farmer, Adi Granov, Roger Langridge, John Layman, Dan Slott, Tom Palmer, Brian Wood, Arthur Adams, Charlie Adlard, Mark Buckingham, Howard Chaykin, Joyce Chin, Frank Cho, Mike Collins, Gary Frank, Sean Phillips, Chris Weston
March 14–15, 2015	ExCeL London		Jonathan Ross, Storage Hunters' Sean Kelly, John Romita Jr.
February 20–21, 2016	ExCeL London		
August 25–27, 2017	Business Design Centre, Islington		

== LSCC London Super Costume Championship Winners ==
Year	Winners	Guest Judge
2014	Nikita Cosplay and Annshella	Yaya Han, Riki LeCotey, Tabitha Lyons and Ethan Van Sciver

== See also ==
- List of comic book conventions
- List of multigenre conventions
