= RDCWorld =

American online video creator collective

YouTube information
- Channel: RDCworld1
- Years active: 2012–present
- Genres: Comedy; sketch; gaming
- Subscribers: 7.2 million
- Views: 1.85 billion
- Last updated: January 2nd, 2026

RDCWorld (or alternatively spelled RDC World), short for Real Dreamers Change the World or Real Dreams Change the World, is an American collective of online video creators based in Texas. The group was founded by Mark Phillips and Affiong Harris. Also composed of members Leland Manigo, Desmond Johnson, Benjamin Skinner, Dylan Patel, and Johnathon Newton, the group is best known for its YouTube comedy videos relating to anime, sports, video games, Internet memes, popular culture, and viral memes.

The group's flagship RDCworld1 channel was registered on YouTube in 2012; as of January 2026, it has amassed over 1.85 billion video views and 7.24 million subscribers.

== History ==
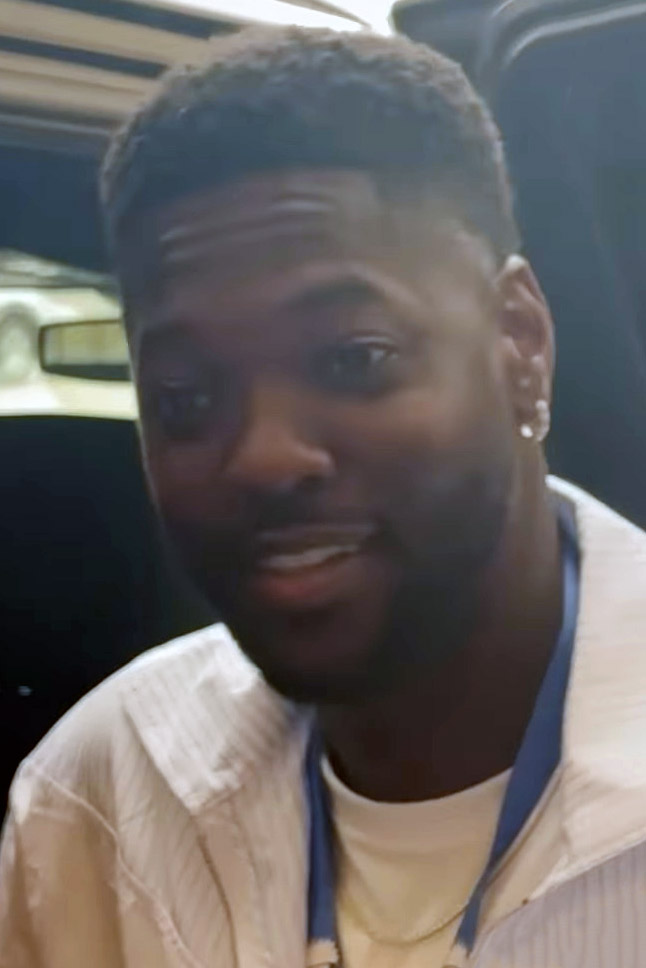
Founder Mark Phillips in 2024

The group was founded in Waco, Texas by Mark Phillips and Affiong Harris. Phillips is described by both RDC and media outlets as the face of the collective. He graduated from the University of North Texas. Harris meanwhile is an alum of North Central Texas College. The group would be joined by members Leland Manigo, Desmond Johnson, Ben Skinner, Dylan Patel, and John Newton.

Originally the YouTube channel served as a means to promote the group's manga, The Resistance. The group's videos are primarily comedy sketches revolving around anime and sports, which led to them gaining sponsorships and commercial ads with companies like Under Armour. With several of their videos pertaining to sports, the group has also been involved in sports events. In 2021, the group was part of House of Highlights' $250K Dodgeball Showdown tournament event. Additionally, the group has been involved with various flag football events, as part of a partnership with the National Football League (NFL). Phillips also appeared in a commercial for the 2022 NBA playoffs.

In 2017, the RDCworld1 channel reached one million subscribers. In 2018, the group also launched the Dream Convention, or Dream Con in Waco, Texas. A multi-genre convention, Dream Con mainly focuses on anime and video gaming culture. RDCWorld revealed their manga, Dark Lights, in May 2023. Dream Con was conceived by RDCWorld1 following challenges they encountered when trying to participate in established fan conventions. According to the group, these experiences highlighted a lack of inclusivity, prompting them to create an event designed to be welcoming to attendees from diverse backgrounds.

In February 2024, the group was nominated for Best Shared Channel at the 2023 Streamer Awards. In December 2024, RDC won the Best Variety Streamer category at the 2024 Streamer Awards. The group also earned nominations for the "League of their Own" and "Best Streamed Event" awards, the latter for their Creator League Basketball event at Dream Con.

== Reception ==
The group has received the attention from public figures referenced in their videos such as J. Cole and LeBron James. The group met the former in 2021; previously, in 2017, Phillips created a meme revolving around an overzealous J. Cole fan. Phillips, Manigo, and Skinner would have cameo appearances in the music video for "The Jackie", a song by Bas featuring J. Cole and Lil Tjay, where they recreated the meme. They further brought back the character from the meme after the release of Cole's seventh studio album, The Fall-Off, which was touted to be his last album.

The group won the Streamy Award for the "Comedy" category in consecutive years: 2022 and 2023. In 2023, the group was also nominated for Streamy Awards in the "Show of the Year" and "Scripted Series" categories.

In 2024, Complex magazine ranked the group number 3 on its list of "The Funniest People on the Internet".

== Awards and nominations ==
Year	Ceremony	Category	Result	Ref.
2022	Streamy Awards	Show of the Year	Nominated	
2022	Streamy Awards	Scripted Series	Nominated	
2022	Streamy Awards	Comedy	Won	
2023	Streamy Awards	Show of the Year	Nominated	
2023	Streamy Awards	Scripted Series	Nominated	
2023	Streamy Awards	Comedy	Won	
2023	The Streamer Awards	Best Shared Channel	Nominated	
2024	The Streamer Awards	Best Streamed Event	Nominated	
2024	The Streamer Awards	Best Variety Streamer	Won	
2024	The Streamer Awards	League of their Own	Nominated	
