= MystiCon =

American science fiction convention

- Status: Active
- Genre: Science fiction, Fantasy, Horror, Paranormal
- Venue: Tanglewood Holiday Inn
- Locations: Roanoke, Virginia
- Country: United States
- Inaugurated: 2011
- Organizer: MystiCon LLC
- Website: http://www.mysticonva.com/

MystiCon is an American science fiction convention held in Roanoke, Virginia. The name "MystiCon" was chosen by the membership as a tribute to an earlier series of Virginia conventions with that name. The organizers include members that left SheVaCon, another Virginia-based science fiction convention, citing concerns with management and operations. The convention was held annually from 2011 through 2020, and resumed in 2026.

== Past events ==
The inaugural MystiCon event was held from February 25–27, 2011, with David Gerrold as the author guest of honor, Randy Asplund as the artist guest of honor, and scream queen Brinke Stevens as the media guest of honor. The convention took place at the Tanglewood Holiday Inn in Roanoke, Virginia, as have all subsequent MystiCon conventions.

MystiCon 2012 was held from February 24–26, 2012. The official attendance was 866 people. Guests included Sherrilyn Kenyon as the author guest of honor and Ursula Vernon as the artist guest of honor. Nicki Clyne was the media guest of honor. Richard Hatch was a late addition as a media co-guest of honor. With the convention doubling is size from the previous year it received regional as well as national coverage.

In 2013, the event was held from February 22–24. Guests included Orson Scott Card as the author guest of honor, Peter Davison as the media guest of honor, and Larry Elmore as the artist guest of honor. Additionally, Bella Morte returned as the musical guest of honor and Steven S. Long was the gaming guest of honor.

The 2014 event was held from February 21–23. Guests included Todd McCaffrey as the author guest of honor, John de Lancie as the media guest of honor and John Jennings as the artist guest of honor. Bella Morte returned again as the musical guest of honor, and Kenneth Hite was the gaming guest of honor.

MystiCon 2015 was held from February 27 through March 1. Sean Maher was the media guest of honor, Alan Dean Foster was to be the author guest of honor but had to cancel and was replaced by Peter David. Scott Rorie was the artist guest of honor, Kevin McKeever was the industry guest of honor, and Bella Morte returned as the musical guest of honor.

In 2016, the event was held from February 26 through February 29. George R.R. Martin was the media and author guest of honor. The convention booked the author for the event four years earlier, when the popularity of HBO's adaptation of his work, Game of Thrones, was just beginning. J.P. Targete was the artist guest of honor, John Watts was the gaming guest of honor, Linda Shuping Smith was the fan guest of honor, and Bella Morte returned yet again as the musical guest of honor.

MystiCon 2017 was held from February 24–26, 2017. Actress Sherilyn Fenn was a guest of honor, as were the actors Tony Todd and Jason Carter, author David Weber, and musicians Bella Morte. The following year, the event was held from February 23–25, 2018. Prominent guests included actors Clare Kramer and Zach Callison as well as the author Joe Lansdale.

MystiCon 2019 was held from February 22–24, 2019, at the Tanglewood Holiday Inn in Roanoke. Guests that year included media guest of honor Robert Picardo, author guest of honor Jody Lynn Nye, and artist guest of honor Ruth Sanderson. The tenth convention was held from February 28–March 1, 2020. That year's guests included actor Zack Ward and author Larry Niven.

Despite the convention being held in 2020, ongoing concerns about the COVID-19 pandemic forced the organizers to cancel the 2021 and 2022 events. The event was also cancelled in 2023, 2024, and 2025.

In 2026, MystiCon returned to the Tanglewood Holiday Inn in Roanoke. The event was held from January 23-25.
