= Jen Cass =

American singer-songwriter

- Genres: Contemporary country
- Years active: 1996 to present
- Labels: Blind Justice Records

Jen Cass is an American singer-songwriter born in Detroit, Michigan.

== Musical career ==
In November 1996, Cass released her first CD, Brave Enough To Say, and quickly sold over 2,000 copies. She recorded with the help of the Russian surf-rock band Red Elvises. Rick Nelson of the Tacoma News Tribune called Brave Enough To Say an "excellent debut" and Cass a "gifted storyteller with a great voice." Agenda's Alan Goldsmith Wrote, "Jen Cass' power as an artist lies in using her voice to capture pictures of broken American souls, and she paints these heartbreaking snapshots of lives gone wrong like nobody else."

After the release of Brave Enough To Say, Cass played many gigs throughout the country. Eventually she caught the attention of producer John Jennings. Recorded by Bob Dawson (Mary Chapin Carpenter, Danny Gatton, Cheryl Wheeler) and featuring several members of Mary Chapin Carpenter's band, Skies Burning Red was nominated for two Detroit Music Awards and six Review Music Awards. Skies Burning Red was No. 12 on WHFR's Best of 2003 list, was a Midnight Special Pick Hit of the Week, and received radio play in every US state as well as Canada, Denmark, Germany, the Netherlands, Japan, and Sweden.

In 2006, Cass and John Jennings collaborated again for Cass's third CD, Accidental Pilgrimage, which also featured the pianist, Grammy winner Jon Carroll and the percussionist Dave Mattacks. "Accidental Pilgrimage" is Cass's most successful release to date, spawning six top 100 singles on the folk chart, moderate crossover success on the Americana Chart, and one hit song, "Dear Mr. President".

Cass currently resides in Flushing, MI with her husband, singer-songwriter Eric Janetsky, and their five kids. Together, they formed the Americana band, The Lucky Nows, along with Michael Robertson, Rosco Selley, and Jon Potrykus. The Lucky Nows first release “Rise” came out in 2018 Cass and Janetsky also host shows at their acoustic venue “Farmhouse Folk”.

== Awards ==
Cass's songs have won a number of awards. In 2003, her song "Main Attraction" was selected as a winner in the Folk Category of both the John Lennon Songwriting Contest and the USA Songwriting Competition. "Small Town Boy" was chosen as the winning song in the 2006 Great Lakes Songwriting Contest.

== Discography ==
By Blind Justice Records

- Accidental Pilgrimage (2006 LP, CD)
- Skies Burning Red (2003 LP, CD)
- Brave Enough To Say (1996 LP, CD)
