= Blerdcon =

Multi-genre fan convention in the United States

Coordinates: 38°50′55″N 77°3′6″W

- Status: Active
- Genre: Multi-genre
- Venue: Hyatt Regency Crystal City at Reagan National Airport; Hilton Arlington National Landing
- Location: Arlington, Virginia
- Country: United States
- Inaugurated: 2017
- Attendance: 9,447 in total
- Website: https://blerdcon.org/

Blerdcon is an annual three-day multi-genre convention held during March at the Hyatt Regency Crystal City at Reagan National Airport and Hilton Arlington National Landing in Arlington, Virginia. The convention's name comes from the word "blerds", a term for black nerds. It was co-founded by Hassan Parrish and Hilton George. Blerdcon aims to be diverse and inclusive.

== Programming ==
Blerdcon typically features cosplay contests, concerts, food trucks, gaming tournaments, maid café, panels, vendors, and workshops. The gaming room is open 24-hours during the event.

== History ==
Blerdcon's idea came out of the experience of attending another convention, MomoCon. First year attendance was higher than expected, with 1,800 people. Blerdcon 2020 was cancelled due to the COVID-19 pandemic. Blerdcon 2021 required attendees to wear masks and provide their COVID-19 vaccination card. The cosplay contest caused controversy in 2021 due to it being won by a Caucasian woman. Blerdcon in 2022 continued to have mask and vaccination requirements. The convention had programming on Thursday in 2023. For safety during the 2025 event, S. Clark Street was closed.

=== Event history ===
Dates	Location	Atten.	Guests
June 30 – July 2, 2017	Hyatt Regency Crystal City at Reagan National Airport; Arlington, Virginia	1,800 (est.)	Bec's Cosplay Wonderland and Eric "The Smoke" Moran.
July 27–29, 2018	Hyatt Regency Crystal City at Reagan National Airport; Arlington, Virginia		Karan Ashley, Mega Ran, Michael "Knightmage" Wilson, Douriean Fletcher, Kevin Grevioux, and Keisha Tucker.
July 12–14, 2019	Hyatt Regency Crystal City at Reagan National Airport; Arlington, Virginia		Beau Billingslea, Estelle, Shaina "Samuraider" West, and Rachel True.
July 16–18, 2021	Hyatt Regency Crystal City at Reagan National Airport; Arlington, Virginia		Karan Ashley, Dax ExclamationPoint, Barr Foxx, Roxxy Haze, Wreck it Ronnie, Scotty Swan, Violette Verse, and Yeliz.
July 8–10, 2022	Hyatt Regency Crystal City at Reagan National Airport; Arlington, Virginia		J'adore Cosplay and Orlando Jones.
July 7–9, 2023	Hyatt Regency Crystal City at Reagan National Airport; Arlington, Virginia		Karan Ashley, Ade M'Cormack, Cree Summer, and Rachel True.
July 12–14, 2024	Hyatt Regency Crystal City at Reagan National Airport; Arlington, Virginia		Ahmed Best, Atandwa Kani, Walter Jones, and Phil LaMarr.
March 7–9, 2025	Hyatt Regency Crystal City at Reagan National Airport; Arlington, Virginia	9,447 in total	Reed Shannon, Chuck Lightning, Janelle Monae, and Chad Weatherford.
March 6–8, 2026	Hyatt Regency Crystal City at Reagan National Airport; Hilton Arlington National Landing; Arlington, Virginia		Samantha Inoue-Harte Zazie Beetz, Godfrey, Carl Jones, Redman, and Dulcé Sloan.
March 5–7, 2027	Hyatt Regency Crystal City at Reagan National Airport; Hilton Arlington National Landing; Arlington, Virginia		
