= Alex Bledsoe =

American author

- Born: February 3, 1963 (age 63); Tennessee
- Education: University of Tennessee
- Occupation: Novelist
- Writing career
- Genre: Fantasy
- Notable work: Eddie LaCrosse novels

Alex Bledsoe (born February 3, 1963) is an American author best known for his sword and sorcery and urban fantasy novels. Bledsoe's work is characterized by hard-boiled protagonists and classic noir themes.

== Biography ==
Alex Bledsoe has been an editor, photographer, reporter, and vacuum cleaner salesman. He was born in western Tennessee and now lives in Mount Horeb, Wisconsin with his wife and three children. He is a graduate of the University of Tennessee.

In 2009, he donated his archive to the department of Rare Books and Special Collections at Northern Illinois University.

== Bibliography ==
In addition to his novel series, Bledsoe has published over fifty short stories.

=== Eddie LaCrosse novels ===
- The Sword-Edged Blonde (2007)
- Burn Me Deadly (2009)
- Dark Jenny (2011)
- Wake of the Bloody Angel (2012)
- He Drank, and Saw the Spider (2014)

=== Memphis Vampires ===
- Blood Groove (2009)
- The Girls with Games of Blood (2010)

=== Tales of the Tufa ===
- The Hum and the Shiver (September 2011)
- Time of the Season, Three Holiday Stories (October 2012, ePub only)
- Shall We Gather (May 2013, short story, ePub only)
- Wisp of a Thing (June 2013)
- Hisses and Wings (December 2014, short story, ePub only), co-author T. Frohock
- The Two Weddings of Bronwyn Hyatt (May 2015, short story, ePub only)
- Long Black Curl (May 2015)
- Chapel of Ease (September 2016)
- Gather Her Round (March 2017)
- The Fairies of Sadieville (April 2018)

=== Tales of the Firefly Witch ===
- The Firefly Witch (2012)
- Croaked (2012)
- Back Atcha (2012)
- Time of the Season, Three Holiday Stories (2012, ePub only)
- The Book of Cunning Women (2013)
