= Continuará... =

Uruguayan fan convention

Continuará… was a fan convention for fans of comics, anime, role-playing games, fantasy and strategy games, among others.

The event took place in Montevideo, Uruguay, and was usually held on the second week of November. The first one took place on 24 and 25 November 2007, and attracted more than 1,000 participants.

== Activities ==
The main focus of "Continuará..." were activities such as Quizzes, a Cosplay contest, a Karaoke contest, Paintball and a massive Twister competition.

== The focal myth ==
Every year "Continuará..." adopted a popular myth as theme of the event. In 2007 they used the myth of "King Arthur and the Round Table" and for 2008 the chosen myth was "The trials of Hercules". The third occasion was in 2009: "Vampire chronicles". The fourth and, so far, last convention was held in November 2010.

== See also ==
- Caballeros de Montevideo, Uruguayan roleplaying games organization.
