= Long Black Curl =

2015 novel by Alex Bledsoe

- First edition cover
- Author: Alex Bledsoe
- Language: English
- Series: Tufa
- Genre: Urban fantasy
- Publisher: Tor Books
- Publication date: May 2015
- Publication place: United States
- Media type: Hardback
- Pages: 382
- ISBN: 978-0-7653-7654-1
- Preceded by: Wisp of a Thing
- Followed by: Chapel of Ease

Long Black Curl is an urban fantasy novel by American writer Alex Bledsoe, first published in the United States in May 2015 by Tor Books. It is the third in a series of six books by Bledsoe about the Tufa living in a remote Appalachian valley in East Tennessee. The Tufa are descendants of Irish fairies and were found in the area when the first European settlers arrived.

Long Black Curl received positive reviews from critics. The book's name was taken from the title of a song by South Carolina singer-songwriter Jennifer Goree.

== Plot introduction ==
Rockabilly singer Byron Harley survives a mountain top plane crash and finds himself stuck in fairy time in Tufa territory. Sixty years go by after he spends only one night in the mountains. Bo-Kate Wisby and Jefferson Powell are young lovers banished from Cloud County by the Tufa for murder; a curse prevents them from returning home and strips them of their magical abilities. All three hate the Tufa for ruining their lives. The curse persists for fifty years, but then starts to weaken and Bo-Kate finds a way to circumvent it and recruits Byron to enact her revenge on the Tufa.

== Critical reception ==
In a review of Long Black Curl in The Magazine of Fantasy & Science Fiction, Canadian fantasy writer Charles de Lint said that while many authors have worked with the myth of blues guitarist Robert Johnson's deal with the Devil at the crossroads, few have used the 1959 plane crash that killed American rock and roll musicians Buddy Holly, Ritchie Valens, and The Big Bopper. Bledsoe's take on The Day the Music Died in his novel has one of three fictitious musicians survive a plane crash in the Appalachian Mountains and wander into Tufa territory where all is not what it seems. de Lint praised the Tufa series for its "strong voice for real North American-based mythic fiction", and added that its "connection to an old and deep mystery is exquisite, while still remaining grounded in the real world".

Faren Miller in Locus also noted how in Long Black Curl, Bledsoe draws on Buddy Holly's ill-fated plane crash for inspiration, and that one of his fictional crash victims, Guy Berry is a "lanky, bespectacled" Holly lookalike. Miller welcomed the book's new revelations about the Tufa's origins, that they had been exiled from Faerie by the Fairy Queen using a curse that sent them west across the ocean. He said the novel spans "a wide emotional spectrum", including "girlish traumas", "lust without love" and "acts of incest". Miller felt that the tension between Bo-Kate and her former lover Jefferson in the novel's closing chapters "delves into an interesting character's heart, mind, memories ... and links to the supernatural."

Writing in a review of Long Black Curl in Library Journal, Megan M. McArdle said she enjoyed seeing the return of some of the major characters from the previous Tufa books, and complimented Bledsoe for having produced "another magical tale". A review in Publishers Weekly described the premise of the book as "solid and fascinating". It said the plot's measured development "works well", but felt that the ending was "rushed".

Kat Hooper called Long Black Curl "an emotional story full of hate, jealousy, revenge, and tragedy ... [that] borders on horror". In a review in Fantasy Literature, Hooper found that the only characters she liked are the outsiders; most of the others are "inbred, nasty, xenophobic, sexist, racist, and brutish". Yet even the unlikable ones are transformed by the book's music. She said "[t]here’s magic in music, and it has the power to change us ... to bridge wide cultural gaps, and to send us to some other time or place". Hooper gave the novel four stars out of five.

== Works cited ==
- Bledsoe, Alex (2015). Long Black Curl. Tor Books. ISBN 978-0-7653-7654-1.
