= Dream Con =

Multi-genre convention in Houston, Texas

Coordinates: 29°45′8″N 95°21′28″W

- Status: Active
- Genre: Multi-genre
- Venue: George R. Brown Convention Center
- Location: Houston, Texas
- Country: United States
- Inaugurated: 2018
- Attendance: 32,674 paid in 2025
- Organizer: RDCWorld
- Website: dreamconvention.com

Dream Con is an annual three-day multi-genre convention held during July at the George R. Brown Convention Center in Houston, Texas. The convention was founded by Mark Phillips and RDCWorld (Real Dreamers Change the World), a YouTube channel and minority owned business.

== Programming ==
The convention's programming includes an artist alley, cosplay contest, exhibitors, gaming tournaments, music concert, panels, and various sports events. Dream Con in 2024 added over $15 million to the Austin, Texas economy. In 2025, Dream Con brought $19.2 million to the Houston, Texas economy.

== History ==
RDCWorld started Dream Con after the group had issues working with other conventions. Dream Con 2020 was cancelled due to the COVID-19 pandemic. The convention, due to growth, moved to Esports Stadium Arlington in 2021 and was sold-out of tickets. It remained at the Esports Stadium for 2022 and attendance was limited to 6,000. The convention's 2022 COVID-19 policies required vaccination or testing to attend.

Dream Con moved in 2023 to the Austin Convention Center and was sold-out of tickets in February. For 2025, the convention moved to the George R. Brown Convention Center due to expected construction at the Austin Convention Center that would make it unavailable for several years. Megan Thee Stallion appeared as a guest, in cosplay, and had a cosplay contest she judged. During a panel she announced an animated series in development with Amazon Prime Video. Prior to the event, the convention apologized for liking controversial posts on Instagram regarding her.

== Event history ==
Dates	Location	Atten.	Guests
August 10-12, 2018	Waco Convention Center; Waco, Texas	1,000 or 1,200	
May 3-5, 2019	Waco Convention Center; Houston, Texas		John Burgmeier, Kyle Hebert, Chuck Huber, and Linda Young.
July 23-24, 2021	Esports Stadium Arlington; Arlington, Texas	3,000 total	Maile Flanagan and Sean Schemmel.
July 15-17, 2022	Esports Stadium Arlington; Arlington, Texas	6,000	Dani Chambers, Gabe Kunda, Anairis Quiñones, and Zeno Robinson.
July 28-30, 2023	Austin Convention Center; Austin, Texas	20,000 or 23,000	
July 26-28, 2024	Austin Convention Center; Hilton Austin; Austin, Texas	19,853 individual or 25,000	Nadji Jeter and Pros and Cons Cosplay.
July 10-13, 2025	George R. Brown Convention Center; Houston, Texas	32,674 paid	Rodney Barnes, Kimberly Brooks, CutiePieSensei, Zeno Robinson, Reed Shannon, Tony Weaver Jr., Dontai, Cedric Yarbrough, Kai Cenat, and Megan Thee Stallion.
July 10-13, 2026	George R. Brown Convention Center; Houston, Texas		Karan Ashley, Nakia Burrise, Xanthe Huynh, Walter E. Jones, Mara Junot, Gabe Kunda, Phil LaMarr, Brandon Jay McLaren, Cree Summer, and Jessie Usher.
