= Orlando World Center Marriott =

Hotel and convention center in Florida, US

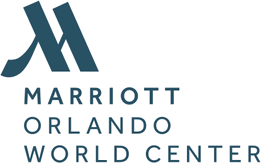

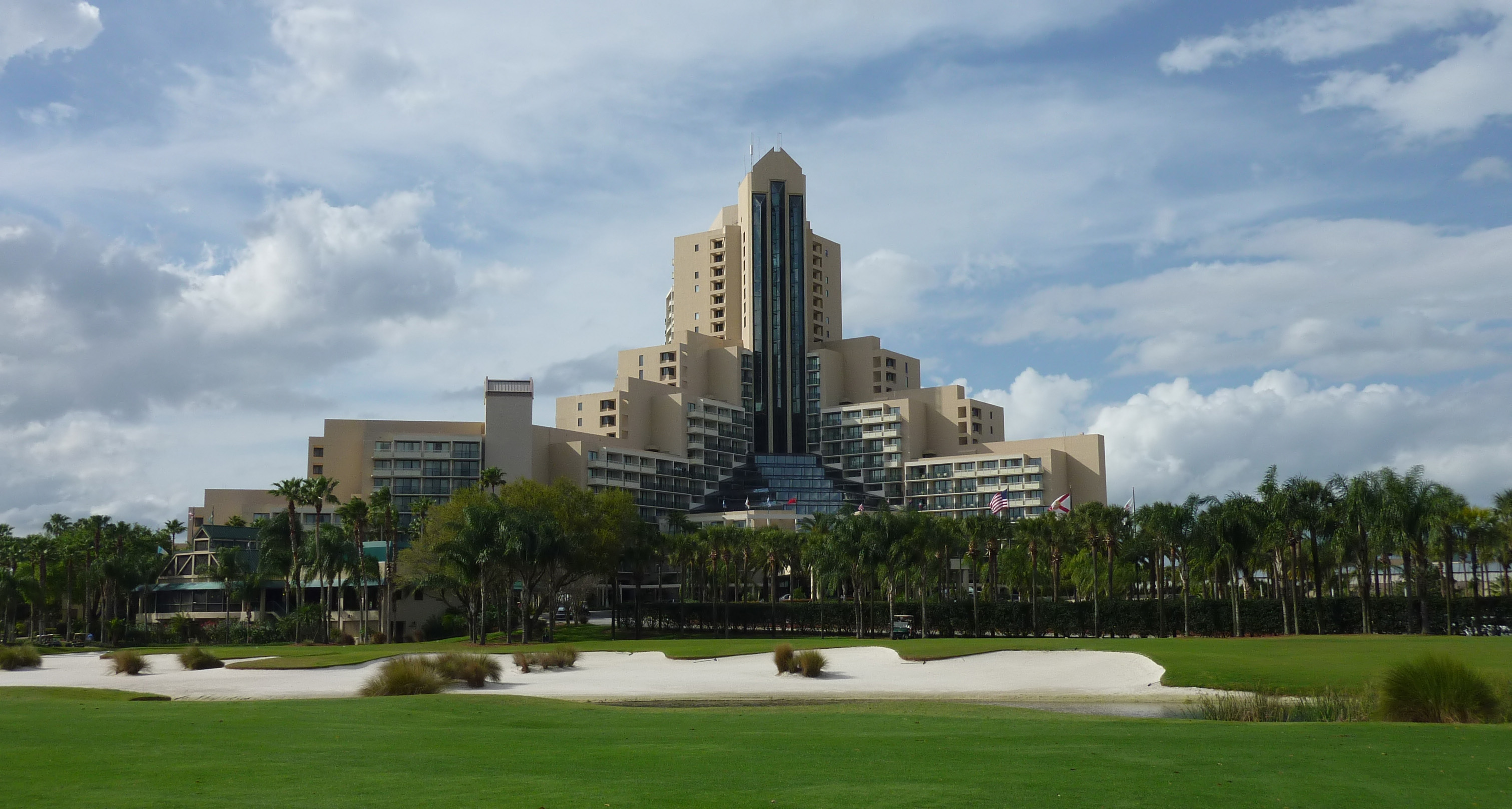
- Interactive map of the Orlando World Center Marriott area

General information
- Location: Orlando, Florida
- Coordinates: 28°21′39″N 81°30′34″W
- Opening: May 15, 1986
- Owner: Host Hotels & Resorts
- Operator: Marriott Hotels & Resorts

Technical details
- Floor count: 28
- Floor area: 1.3 million square feet (120×10^{3} m^{2})

Other information
- Number of rooms: 2,008
- Number of suites: 110
- Number of restaurants: 9

Website
- Orlando World Center Marriott

Orlando World Center Marriott is a hotel and convention center near Orlando, Florida. The resort, which is close to Walt Disney World, is located off of World Center Drive, which was renamed from International Drive to the resort's namesake after the southern extension of International Drive was built.

== Resort property ==
Marriott's Orlando World Center opened on March 24, 1986. At the time it was the largest hotel in Florida, and it is now the largest Marriott in the world. The 2,008-room, 28-story building contains a nine-story lobby atrium, 38,000-square-foot (3,500 m^{2}) and also has the largest pillar-free ballroom in the world featuring 105,000 square feet (9,800 m^{2}) of meeting space. In total there is more than 450,000 square feet (42,000 m^{2}) of meeting space, six swimming pools (the main lagoon pool is the largest in Orlando), and ten restaurants and lounges. The 200-acre (0.81 km^{2}) resort property is also home to the 18-hole Hawk's Landing Golf Course, and the Marriott Vacation Club resorts of Marriott's Sabal Palms, Marriott's Royal Palms and Marriott's Imperial Palm Villas.

In 2002, the hotel completed building a brand new 500-room tower, making the hotel the world's largest Marriott.

In 2007, the hotel added 104,000 square feet (9,700 m^{2}) of meeting space called the Cypress Ballroom which now connects with the Convention Center.

In 2008, the resort was awarded Green Lodging certification by the Florida Department of Environmental Protection.

In the Nickelodeon show Get the Picture, winning contestants could win trips to the Orlando Marriott World Center. Photos of the resort circa 1991–1993 can be seen on the show.

Marriott currently partners with Encore Event Technologies to provide in-house audiovisual services to guests, corporations, and hotel staff.
