= Oaks, Pennsylvania =

Unincorporated community in Pennsylvania, US

- Unincorporated community
- Location within Pennsylvania Location within the United States
- Coordinates: 40°07′54″N 75°27′35″W
- Country: United States
- State: Pennsylvania
- County: Montgomery
- Township: Upper Providence
- Elevation: 121 ft (37 m)
- Time zone: UTC-5 (Eastern (EST))
  - Summer (DST): UTC-4 (EDT)
- ZIP code: 19456
- Area codes: 610 and 484
- GNIS feature ID: 1182847

Oaks is an unincorporated community located in Upper Providence Township, Montgomery County, Pennsylvania, United States. The community is 18 miles (30 km) northwest of Philadelphia and its boundaries are defined in large part by the village's position at the junction of Perkiomen Creek and the Schuylkill River.

== History ==
The two waterways defined much of the village's early history. In 1825, the Schuylkill Navigation Company completed the Schuylkill Canal and Brower's Locks at Oaks, and the system was heavily traveled. The village of Oaks was named after the canal's designer, Thomas Oakes. Later in the nineteenth century, the railroad largely supplanted the role of the canal. The Perkiomen Railroad built the Oaks station in 1868. The Philadelphia and Reading, sometimes referred to as the Reading Railroad, merged the short line as its Perkiomen Branch. Oaks village cropped up around the station.

== Demographics ==
Historical population
Census	Pop.	Note	%±

The United States Census Bureau defined Oaks as a census designated place (CDP) in 2023.

== Present ==
Oaks today is set in dense suburbs. Many of its original structures remain, including the general store, the locktender's house, and many historic homes. Although the tracks are no longer in service in the center of Oaks, a station built in 1918 to replace the original is still located today at the intersection of Egypt Road and Station Avenue.

In 1985, construction of the eastern portion of US Route 422 was completed, connecting King of Prussia to Oaks and out to Reading and beyond, and spurring growth in the area. However, Oaks remained less developed than its suburban neighbors, due to a limited number of connections to its wastewater treatment plant. As plans for a new plant began, development started in the retail space next to the highway, starting with the construction of several modern box store retailers and a 24-theater cinema. In 2008, the expanded Oaks Wastewater Treatment Plant was completed, and a new round of both housing and retail growth began, including the opening of the Greater Philadelphia Expo Center.

Interest in resuming rail service was spurred by the Schuylkill Valley Metro (SVM) project, which was rejected by Federal Transit Administration in 2006. Another cancelled proposal called the Greenline would have made Oaks the terminus of a new rail line to Paoli, with a new station located adjacent to the Expo Center.

== Attractions ==
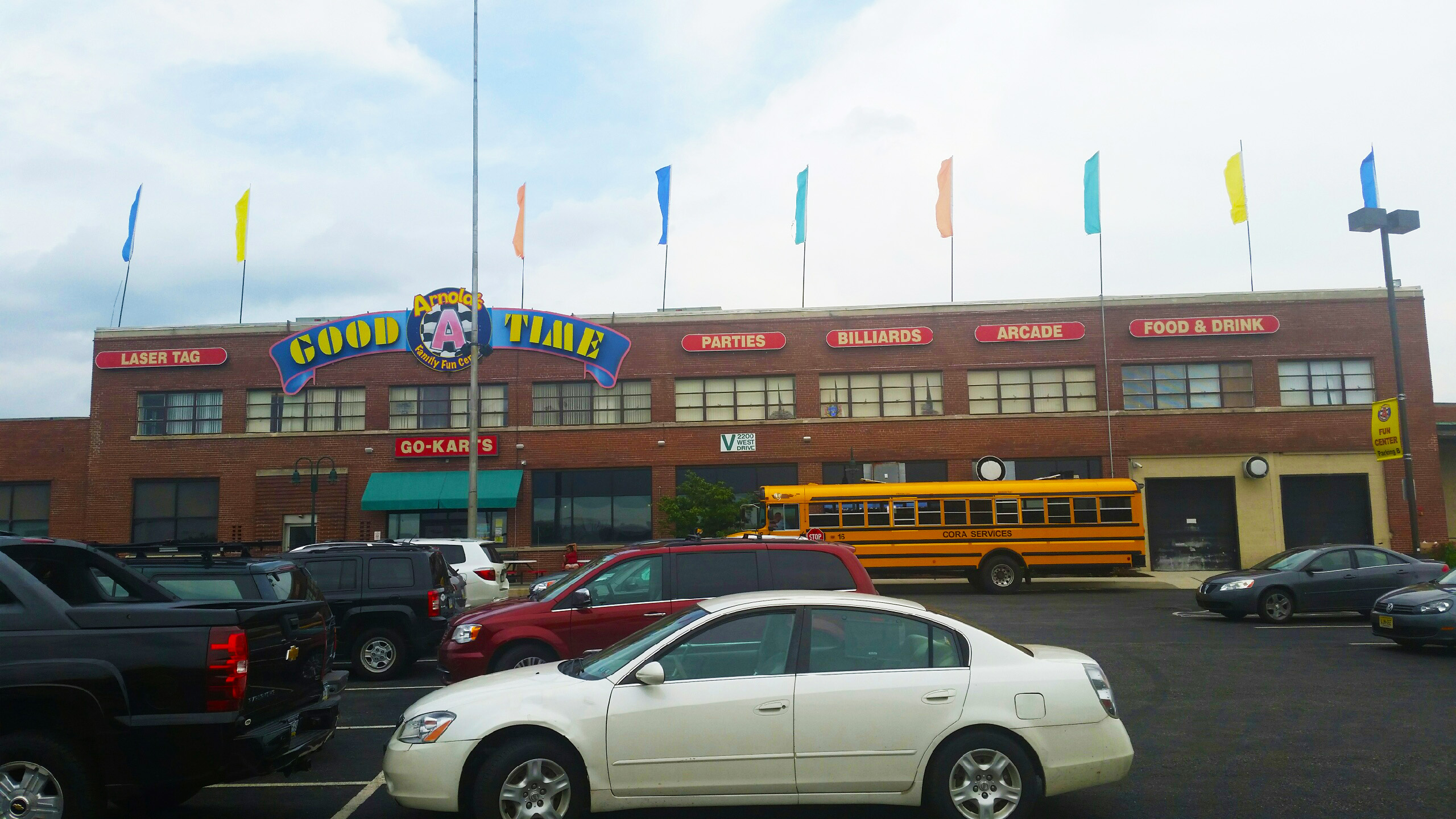
Arnold's Family Fun Center

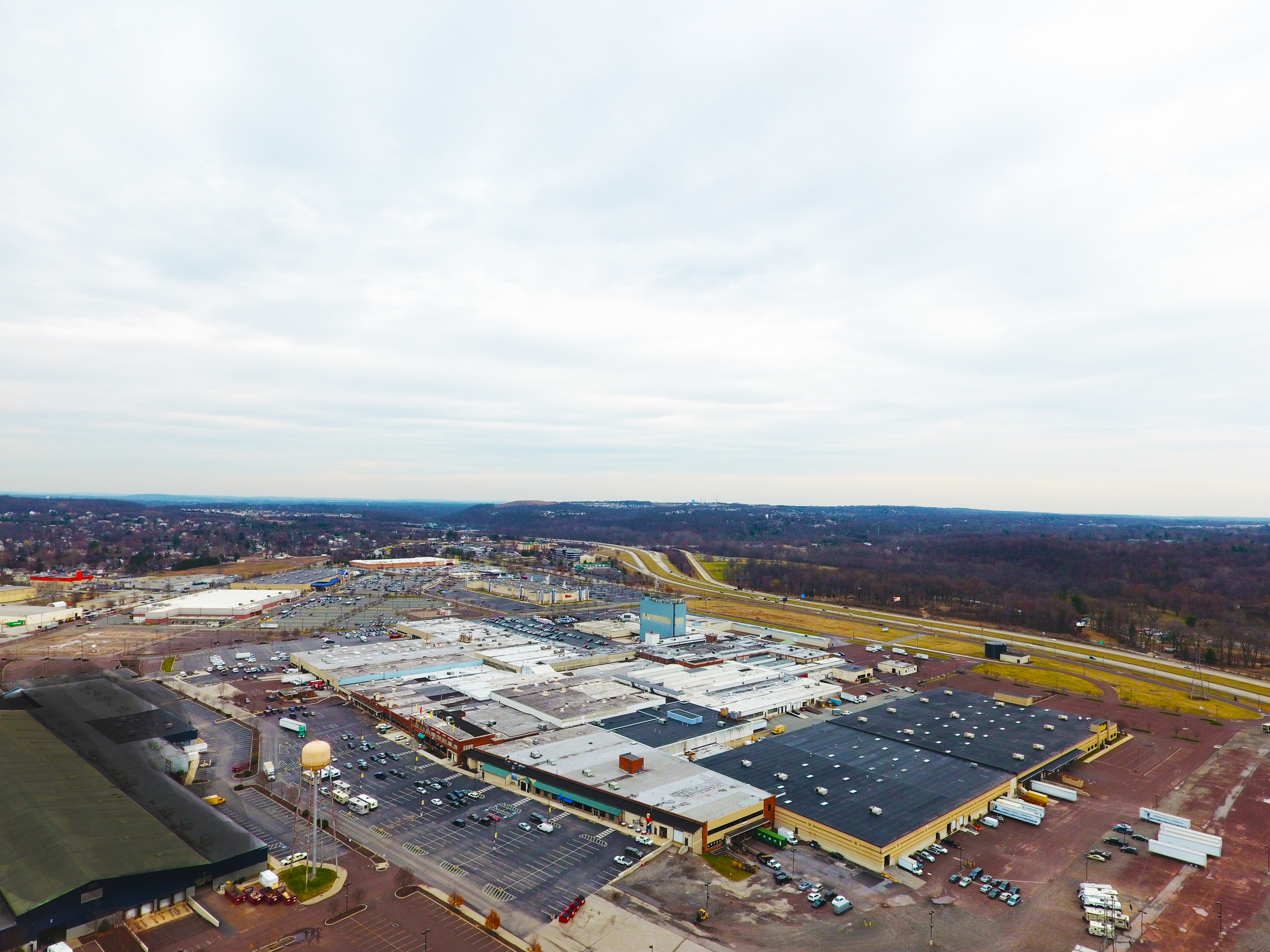
422 Business Center

Public attractions in Oaks include the 107-acre (0.43 km^{2}) Lower Perkiomen Valley Park, Schuylkill River Trail, and the Perkiomen Trail. The private West Collection of artwork is open to the public at the headquarters of SEI Investments, and Oaks is now home to the Greater Philadelphia Expo Center. It is also home to Arnold's Family Fun Center, the region's largest indoor entertainment center. Another attraction is the American Treasure Tour. The ZIP code is 19456.

== Sports ==
Oaks was the home of the Valley Forge Freedom of the Mid-Atlantic Hockey League. The Philadelphia Hawks of the United States Australian Football League plays its home games at Lower Perkiomen Valley Park.

== Notable person ==
- Jacob G. Francis, founder of Elizabethtown College
- Harry Whittier Frees, photographer
