= Greater Philadelphia Expo Center =

Exposition center

Coordinates: 40.12330°N 75.45843°W

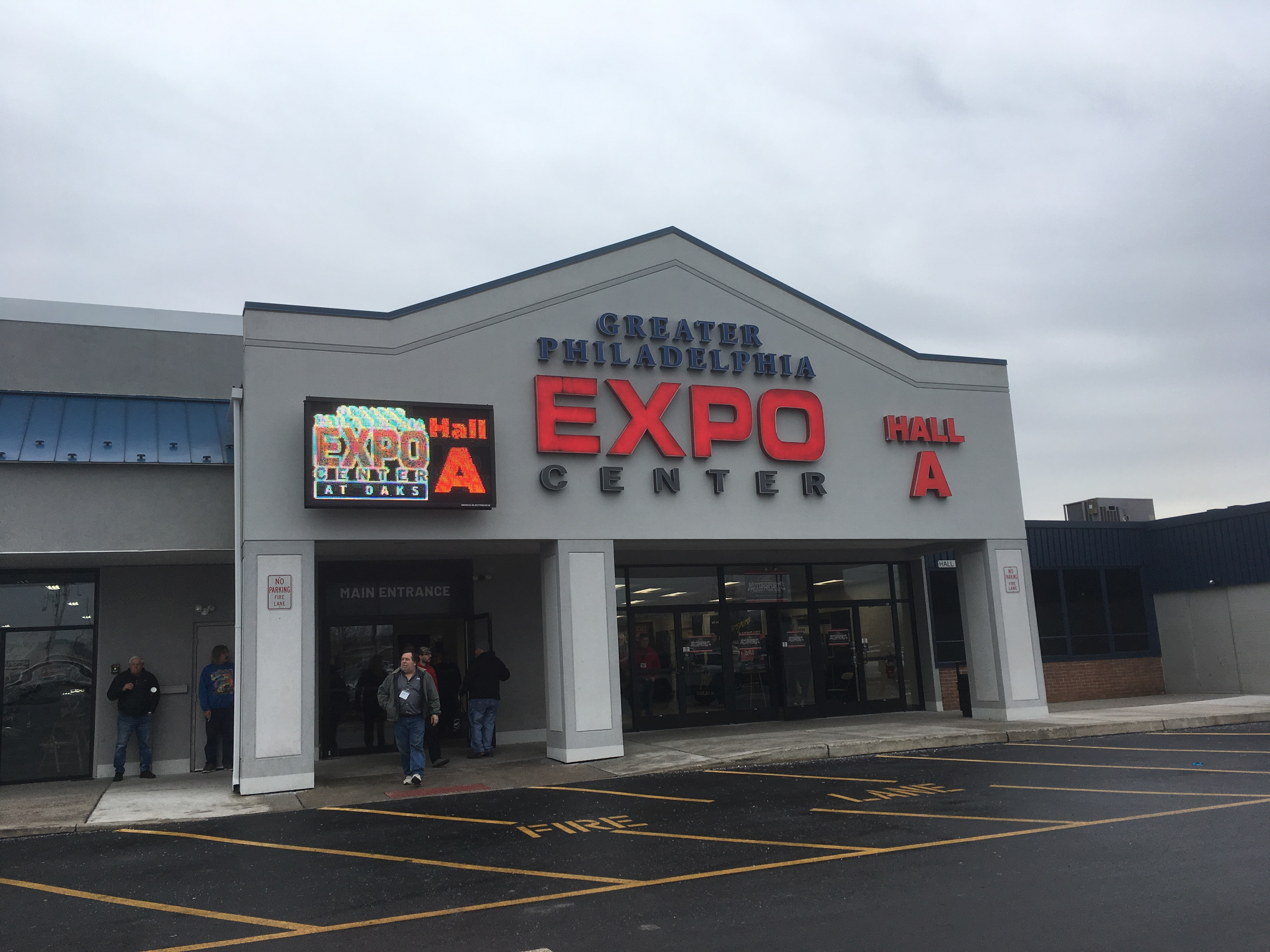
- Greater Philadelphia Expo Center entrance
- Interactive map of Greater Philadelphia Expo Center
- Address: 100 Station Avenue
- Location: Oaks, Pennsylvania 19456
- Public transit: SEPTA bus: 99

Construction
- Opened: 2009
- Renovated: 2018

Website
- Official website

The Greater Philadelphia Expo Center at Oaks is an exhibition center located in Oaks, Pennsylvania. It has five adjoining exhibit halls, 9 meeting rooms, two small food courts, and a total area of over 240,000 square feet on one floor. It is among the largest suburban exposition centers on the East Coast of the United States.

Oaks, Pennsylvania is approximately 7 miles (11 km) northwest of King of Prussia via the Pottstown Expressway (U.S. Route 422).
