= List of comic book conventions =

This is a list of noteworthy comic book conventions, (Note: A convention is presumed noteworthy if it has received significant coverage in reliable sources that are independent of the convention and satisfies the inclusion criteria for a stand-alone article. Other conditions may apply.) as distinct from anime conventions, brony conventions, furry conventions, gaming conventions, horror conventions, multigenre conventions, and science fiction conventions.

== Africa ==
=== Algeria ===
- Algiers International Comics Festival in Algiers, Algeria (est. 2008)

=== Egypt ===
- EgyCon in Cairo, Egypt (est. 2013)
- Cairo Comix Con in Cairo, Egypt (est. 2015)

=== South Africa ===
- Comic Con Cape Town in Cape Town (est. 2023)

== Americas ==
=== Argentina ===
- Fantabaires in Buenos Aires (est. 1996)

=== Brazil ===
- Bienal de Quadrinhos de Curitiba in Curitiba, PR (est. 2011)
- Comic Con Experience (CCXP) in São Paulo, SP (est. 2014)
- Festival Internacional de Quadrinhos (FIQ) in Belo Horizonte, MG (est. 1999)
- PerifaCon (Favela Comic Con) in São Paulo, SP (est. 2019)

=== Canada ===
- Calgary Comic and Entertainment Expo in Calgary, Alberta (est. 2005)
- Fan Expo Canada in Toronto, Ontario (est. 1995)
- Hal-Con in Halifax, Nova Scotia (est. 2010)
- Montreal Comiccon in Montreal, Quebec (est. 2006)
- Ottawa Comiccon in Ottawa, Ontario (est. 2012)
- Toronto Comic Arts Festival in Toronto, Ontario (TCAF) (est. 2003)
- Toronto Comicon in Toronto, Ontario (est. 2001)
- Winnipeg Comiccon in Winnipeg, Manitoba (est. 2021)

=== United States ===
- Alamo City Comic Con in San Antonio, Texas (est. 2013)
- Alternative Press Expo in San Jose, California (est. 1994)
- Baltimore Comic-Con in Baltimore, Maryland (est. 2000)
- Big Apple Comic Con in New York City, New York (est. 1996)
- Chicago Comic & Entertainment Expo in Chicago, Illinois (est. 2010)
- Comicpalooza in Houston, Texas (est. 2008)
- Dragon Con in Atlanta, Georgia (est. 1987)
- East Coast Black Age of Comics Convention in Philadelphia, Pennsylvania (est. 2002)
- East Coast Comicon in Secaucus, New Jersey (est. 2012 as "Asbury Park Comicon")
- Emerald City Comic Con in Seattle, Washington (est. 2003)
- Fan Expo Boston in Boston, Massachusetts (formerly Boston Comic Con) (est. 2007)
- Fan Expo Chicago in suburban Chicago, Illinois (est. 1972 as "Nostalgia '72;" later known as the "Chicago Comicon" and "Wizard World Chicago")
- Fan Expo Dallas in Dallas, Texas (formerly Dallas Comic Con) (est. 2002)
- Fan Expo Denver in Denver, Colorado (formerly Denver Comic Con and Denver Pop Culture Con) (est. 2012)
- FanX in Salt Lake City, Utah (formerly Salt Lake Comic Con) (est. 2013)
- Heroes Convention in Charlotte, North Carolina (est. 1982)
- Intervention in the Washington, D.C. area (est. 2010)
- L.A. Comic Con in Los Angeles, California (est. 2011)
- MegaCon in Orlando, FL (est. 1993)
- Memphis Comic and Fantasy Convention in Memphis, Tennessee (est. 2010)
- MoCCA Festival in New York City, New York (est. 2002)
- Motor City Comic Con in Novi, Michigan (est. 1989)
- New York Comic Con in New York City, New York (est. 2006)
- Ohio Comic Con in Columbus, Ohio (est. 1980 as "Mid-Ohio Con")
- Pensacola Comic Convention, Pensacola, Florida (est. 2010 as "Pensacola Para Con Comic Convention")
- Phoenix Fan Fusion in Phoenix, Arizona (est. 2002 as "Phoenix Cactus Comicon")
- Pittsburgh Comicon in Monroeville, Pennsylvania (est. 1994)
- Planet Comicon Kansas City in Kansas City, Missouri (est. 1999)
- PopCon Indy in Indianapolis, Indiana (est. 2014)
- Puerto Rico Comic Con in San Juan, Puerto Rico (est. 2002)
- Rhode Island Comic Con in Providence, Rhode Island (est. 2012)
- Rose City Comic Con in Portland, Oregon (est. 2012)
- San Diego Comic-Con in San Diego, California (est. 1970 as the "Golden State Comic Book Convention")
- SiliCon in San Jose, California (formerly Silicon Valley Comic Con) (est. 2016)
- Small Press Expo in Bethesda, Maryland (est. 1994)
- Small Press and Alternative Comics Expo (SPACE) in Columbus, Ohio (est. 2000)
- STAPLE! in Austin, Texas (est. 2005)
- WonderCon in Anaheim, California (est. 1987 in Bay Area as "Wonderful World of Comics Convention")

== Asia ==
=== Bahrain ===
- IGN Convention in Manama, Bahrain (est. 2013)

=== Hong Kong ===
- Animation-Comic-Game Hong Kong in Wan Chai, Hong Kong (est. 2004)

=== India ===
- Comic Con India in Delhi, Mumbai, Bangalore, and Hyderabad, India (est. 2011)

=== Indonesia ===
- Comifuro in BSD City, Tangerang Regency, Indonesia (est. 2012)
- Indonesia Comic Con in PIK 2, Tangerang Regency, Indonesia (est. 2015)

=== Japan ===
- Comiket in Tokyo, Japan (est. 1975)

=== Malaysia ===
- Comic Fiesta in Kuala Lumpur, Malaysia (est. 2002)

=== Philippines ===
- Asia Pop Comic Convention in Metro Manila, Philippines (est. 2015)
- Komikon in Metro Manila, Philippines (est. 2005)

=== South Korea ===
- Comic World in Seoul and Busan, South Korea (est. 1999)

=== United Arab Emirates ===
- IGN Convention in Dubai, United Arab Emirates (est. 2013)
- Middle East Film and Comic Con in Dubai, United Arab Emirates (est. 2012)

== Europe ==
=== Belgium ===
- F.A.C.T.S. in Ghent, Belgium (est. 1993)

=== Finland ===
- Helsinki Comics Festival in Helsinki, Finland (est. 1979)

=== France ===
- Angoulême International Comics Festival in Angoulême, France (est. 1974)
- Comic Con Paris in Paris, France (est. 2007)
- Générations Star Wars et Science Fiction in Cusset, France (est. 1999)
- Lille Comics Festival in Lille, France (est. 2006)

=== Germany ===
- German Comic Con in Dortmund, Berlin, Munich, and Frankfurt (est. 2015)

=== Greece ===
- AthensCon in Athens, Greece (est. 2015)

=== Italy ===
- International Cartoonists Exhibition in Rapallo (est. 1972)
- Lucca Comics & Games in Lucca (est. 1965 in Bordighera as "Salone Internazionale del Comics")
- Mantua Comics & Games in Mantua (est. 2006)
- Romics in Rome (est. 2001)

=== Poland ===
- International Festival of Comics and Games in Łódź, Poland (est. 1991)
- Pyrkon in Poznań, Poland (est. 1999)
- Warsaw Comic Con in Warsaw, Poland (est. 2017)

=== Portugal ===
- Amadora BD in Amadora, Portugal (est. 1989)

=== Romania ===
- East European Comic Con in Bucharest, Romania (est. 2013)

=== Russia ===
- Comic-Con Russia, annual fan convention held in Moscow, Russia (est. 2014)
- Starcon, annual convention held in Saint Petersburg, Russia (est. 1999)

=== Serbia ===
- International Comics Festival "Salon stripa" in Belgrade, Serbia (est. 2003)

=== Slovakia ===
- Comics Salon, Bratislava, Slovakia (est. 2004)

=== Spain ===
- Barcelona International Comic Fair, Barcelona, Spain (est. 1981)

=== Switzerland ===
- FANTASY BASEL - The Swiss Comic Con, Basel, Switzerland (est. 2015)

=== United Kingdom ===
- ACME Comic Con in Glasgow, Scotland (est. 2022)
- Comic Con Liverpool in Liverpool, England (est. 2018)
- Comic Con Scotland in Edinburgh, Scotland (est. 2018)
- Comic Con Wales in Newport, Wales (est. 2022)
- Comic Con Northern Ireland in Lisburn, Belfast, Northern Ireland (est. 2022)
- The Lakes International Comic Art Festival in Kendal, England (est. 2013)
- London Film and Comic Con in London, England (est. 2004)
- MCM London Comic Con in London, England (est. 2002)
- Thought Bubble Festival in Yorkshire, England (est. 2007)
- Wales Comic Con in Wrexham, Wales and Telford, England (est. 2008)

=== Ukraine ===
- Comic Con Ukraine in Kyiv, Ukraine (est. 2018)

== Oceania ==
=== Australia ===
- Australian Movie & Comic Expo (formerly Armageddon), in Melbourne (est. 1995)
- Supanova Expo in various cities (est. 2002)
- Oz Comic Con in various cities (est. 2012)

=== New Zealand ===
- Armageddon in Auckland, Wellington, Christchurch, and Dunedin (est. 1995)

== See also ==
- List of defunct comic book conventions
