= Central Canada Comic Con =

Multi-genre fan convention in Winnipeg, Canada

- Status: Defunct
- Genre: Speculative fiction
- Venue: Winnipeg Convention Centre
- Location: Winnipeg, Manitoba
- Country: Canada
- Inaugurated: 2006
- Most recent: 2018
- Attendance: 70,000 (2016)
- Organizer: River City Conventions Inc.
- Website: http://www.c4con.com/

Central Canada Comic Con (C4) was an annual fan convention held in Winnipeg, Manitoba. The Central Canada Comic Con was Central Canada's largest convention celebrating the best in comic books, science fiction, gaming, anime, fantasy, horror and pop culture.

== History ==
This show began to grow in 1994 as a simple weekend trade show called the Manitoba Collector's Expo. Back in 1994 it showcased everything from sports cards to antiques to toys and comic books. As times changed, so did the event, and in 2000 it became the Manitoba Toy & Comic Expo, dropping the antiques and reducing the sports cards.

In 2006, the show expanded as the Manitoba Comic Con, and brought in attendees from all over Manitoba and North Dakota. The show focused on toys, comic books, gaming, anime, and local artists.

In 2007 it brought in the media aspect with David Prowse, Richard Hatch and Margot Kidder.

In 2008, the convention moved to the Winnipeg Convention Centre with guests like Lou Ferrigno, Jeremy Bulloch, LeVar Burton, Erica Durance, Justin Hartley, Charlie Adler and John de Lancie.

Wizard World purchased the convention shortly after the 2010 show, but dropped out in June 2011.

In 2013 C4 received the "Winnipeg Tourism Marketing Campaign (under $2500) Award of Distinction", presented to a tourism individual, organization, business or marketing consortium in recognition of a creative or innovative marketing campaign.

In April 2019, C4 announced that it would not hold a show in 2020. The convention ceased operations after its operator, River City Conventions, announced their closure on September 24, 2019. In November 2019, CapeFlow Productions, organizers of Montreal Comiccon and Ottawa Comiccon, announced that it would host Winnipeg Comiccon at the RBC Convention Centre beginning in 2020, inheriting C4's previous late-October scheduling. The inaugural event was postponed to 2021 due to COVID-19.

=== Event history ===
| Dates | Location | Attendance | Guests |
|---|---|---|---|
| 1994 | Winnipeg, Manitoba | | |
| 1995 | Winnipeg, Manitoba | | |
| 1996 | Winnipeg, Manitoba | | |
| 1997 | Winnipeg, Manitoba | | |
| 1998 | Winnipeg, Manitoba | | |
| 1999 | Winnipeg, Manitoba | | |
| 2000 | Winnipeg, Manitoba | | |
| 2001 | Winnipeg, Manitoba | | |
| 2002 | Winnipeg, Manitoba | | |
| 2003 | Winnipeg, Manitoba | | |
| 2004 | Winnipeg, Manitoba | | |
| November 6, 2005 | Assiniboine Gordon Hotel; Winnipeg, Manitoba | | |
| November 4–5, 2006 | Assiniboine Gordon Hotel; Winnipeg, Manitoba | 3,000 | George Freeman, Digital Chameleon alumni |
| October 27–28, 2007 | Victoria Inn; Winnipeg, Manitoba | | David Prowse, Richard Hatch, Margot Kidder, Gwynyth Walsh, Barbara March |
| October 11–12, 2008 | Winnipeg Convention Centre; Winnipeg, Manitoba | 16,000+ | Lou Ferrigno, Jeremy Bulloch, LeVar Burton, Erica Durance, Justin Hartley, Charlie Adler, Gerrit Graham, and John de Lancie |
| October 31 – November 1, 2009 | Winnipeg Convention Centre; Winnipeg, Manitoba | 15,000+ | Adam West, Julie Newmar, Peter Mayhew, Marv Wolfman, Tommy Castillo, Nigel Sade, Echo Chernik, Lucie Brouillard |
| October 29–31, 2010 | Winnipeg Convention Centre; Winnipeg, Manitoba | 20,000+ | Garrett Wang, Orli Shoshan |
| October 28–30, 2011 | Winnipeg Convention Centre; Winnipeg, Manitoba | 27,000 | William Shatner, Jonathan Frakes, Kevin Sorbo, Kate Vernon, Ethan Phillips, Nana Visitor, Chase Masterson, Adrienne Wilkinson, Maria de Aragon, Bret "The Hitman" Hart |
| November 2–4, 2012 | Winnipeg Convention Centre; Winnipeg, Manitoba | 34,000 | Patrick Stewart, Nichelle Nichols, Marina Sirtis, Billy Dee Williams, Dean Cain, Tia Carrere, Alan Oppenheimer, Aaron Ashmore, Paul McGillion, Torri Higginson, Vic Mignogna, Zoie Palmer, Tamara Gorski, Michael Golden, Renée Witterstaetter, Rodney Ramos, Tommy Castillo, Marc Wolfe, Nigel Sade, Amul Kumar, Ric Meyers, Mark Texeira, George Pérez, Dennis Calero, Matt Triano, Arthur Suydam, Kevin Nash |
| November 1–3, 2013 | RBC Convention Centre Winnipeg; Winnipeg, Manitoba | 44,000+ | Celebrity guests: Ron Perlman, Bill Goldberg, James Marsters, David Prowse, Tony Amendola, Aaron Ashmore, Bruce Boxleitner, Avery Brooks, Malcolm Danare, Brendan Hunter, Walter Koenig, Robert Duncan McNeill, Chris Sarandon, Laura Vandervoort Guest artists: Ethan Van Sciver, Mark Sparacio, Jeff Balke, Robert Bailey, Tommy Castillo, George Frei, Mitch Gerads, Anthony Hary, Greg Horn, Ken Lashley, Marvin Mariano, Christopher Mitten, Richard Pace, Gordon Purcell, NEN, Nigel Sade, Stuart Sayger, Brent Schoonover, Tyler Walpole, Sarah Wilkinson, Marc Wolfe Featured wrestlers: Bill Goldberg, Ted DiBiase, Tommy Dreamer, Maria Kanellis (Cancelled), Angelina Love |
| October 31 – November 2, 2014 | RBC Convention Centre Winnipeg; Winnipeg, Manitoba | 37,000 | Celebrity guests: Peter Hambleton, Adam Brown, Jed Brophy, Graham McTavish, Adrian Paul, Nicole De Boer, René Auberjonois, John de Lancie, Jeremy Bulloch, Ron Rubin, Rick Howland, Paul Amos, Kris Holden-Ried, Riddle, Kay Pike, Katt Gunn Guest artists: José Delbo, Jeff Balke, Eric Basaldua, Tommy Castillo, GMB Chomichuk, Richard Comely, John Gallagher, Greg Horn, Rob Hunter, Lovern Kindzierski, Robert Luedke, Dave Ross, Peter Repovski, JP Roth, Joe Rubenstein, Nigel Sade, Cory Smith, Don Sparrow, Doug Wheatley, Sarah Wilkinson Featured wrestlers: Jake 'The Snake' Roberts, Tito Santana, Victoria |
| October 30 – November 1, 2015 | RBC Convention Centre Winnipeg; Winnipeg, Manitoba | 48,000 | Celebrity guests: Tim Rose, David Yost, Walter Emanuel Jones, Gates McFadden, Garrett Wang, Robert Picardo, Veronica Taylor, James Marsters, Nalini Krishan, Carel Struycken, Sean Schemmel, Sylvester McCoy Guest artists: Neal Adams, Rodney Ramos, Richard S. Meyers, Matt Triano, Jamie Snell, Jeff Balke, Robert Luedke, Tommy Castillo, Nigel Sade, Sara Wilkinson, Greg Horn, John Gallagher, Todd McCaffrey, Christopher Jones, Stephen 'Steve' B. Scott, Echo Chernik, Ashleigh Popplewell, Pablo Hidalgo, M C Joudrey Featured wrestlers: Rob Van Dam |
| October 28–30, 2016 | RBC Convention Centre Winnipeg; Winnipeg, Manitoba | 70,000 | |
| October 27–29, 2017 | RBC Convention Centre Winnipeg; Winnipeg, Manitoba | | |
| October 26–28, 2018 | RBC Convention Centre Winnipeg; Winnipeg, Manitoba | | |

== See also ==
- List of comic book conventions
- Winnipeg Comiccon, organized by Capeflow Productions since 2021
- Ai-Kon, Winnipeg's anime convention
