= Deena Mohamed =

Egyptian graphic designer and author (born 1995)

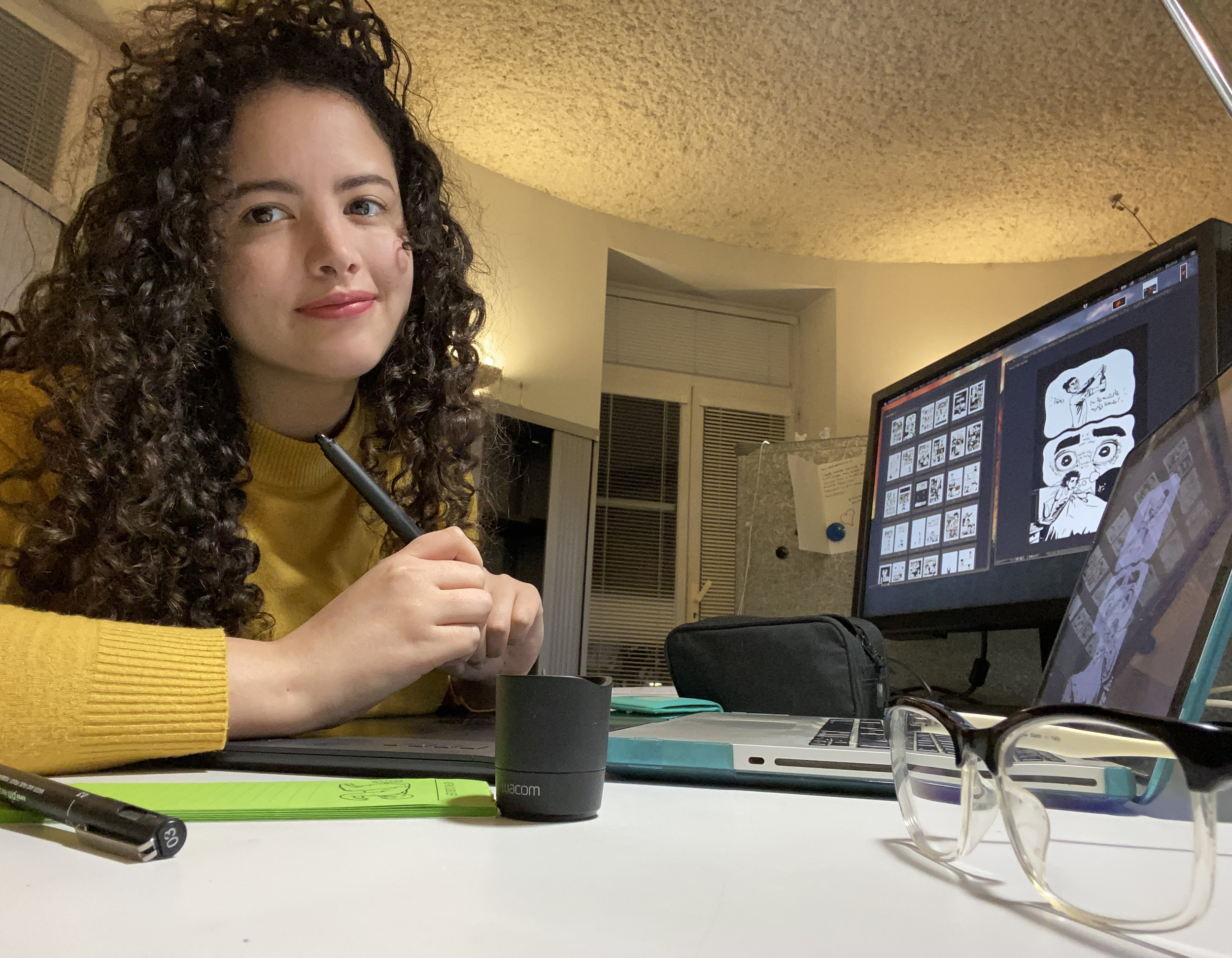
Deena in studio from author's website: Born / 1995 (age 30–31); Nationality / Egyptian; Known for / Shubeik Lubeik; Website / www.deenadraws.art

Deena Mohamed (Arabic: دينا محمد, born ca. 1995) is a graphic designer, graphic novelist, and illustrator, who was born and raised in Egypt. She is the author and illustrator of the graphic novel trilogy Shubeik Lubeik.

She made her debut at the age of 18 with her webcomic Qahera, which combines both Islamic and feminist values.

Mohamed has collaborated with various advocacy groups, such as Harassmap and Centre for Applied Human Rights, to create informational comics.

== Written works ==
=== Shubeik Lubeik ===
Shubeik Lubeik is an urban fantasy graphic novel trilogy that explores an imagined modern-day Egypt in which wishes are sold in bottles. The graphic novel was originally published in Arabic and later translated into English and other languages.

Its first installment follows a poor woman named Aziza who is against using wishes, having seen her childhood friend, and later husband, put all of his hope in them for many years without success. After her husband dies, Aziza manages to buy a very powerful (and very discounted) wish from a local kiosk, but must overcome many difficult institutional hurdles in order to use it.

Its second installment centers on Nour, a wealthy nonbinary university student in Cairo with depression. They manage to find the same kiosk and purchase a powerful wish for themselves, but struggles to figure out what wish will help them find happiness.

Its third installment returns to the kiosk owner, Shokry, who has one wish left that no one seems to want to buy. He is religiously against wishes, but when he finds out that his close friend is dying of cancer, he becomes conflicted. This installment explores Shokry's and his friend's personal histories, and show how they arrived at the beliefs they have about wishes. It also explores a history of Western colonial exploitation of wishes as natural resources and the effects of wish usage on Egypt outside of Cairo.

=== Qahera ===
Qahera is Mohamed's first webcomic, first published in 2013, at the age of 18, and is currently still ongoing. Originally published in English, then also in Arabic, the webcomic follows a nameless Egyptian female superhero on the lookout for social issues faced by women in the Arab world. She has criticized sexual harassment, corrupt police, retrograde clerics, and Western feminism.

The series, which began as a joke amongst friends but soon became a viral phenomenon, had nearly 500,000 unique visitors, with an average of 10,000 hits per day between September and November 2013.

== Visual works ==
Mohamed has collaborated with various advocacy groups to create informational comics.

In a cartoon for the online literary magazine ArabLit.org, she described her experience of creating her work in English, addressing international readers, as opposed to using Arabic for an Egyptian and Arab public. Even though she considers both of these forms of expression as part of her personality, she sometimes uses different issues, like feminism in Arabic and Islamophobia in English.

=== Harassmap Consent Campaign ===
A 2018 social media campaign that includes a series of short comics, in collaboration with Harassmap, about consent. Each comic strip discusses consent in various contexts. The lead for this project was Rebecca Chiao, the co-founder of Harassmap, a project aimed to bring awareness to sexual violence in Egypt.

=== Center for Applied Human Rights Comics ===
A series of comic strips, illustrated by Mohamed, in which each depicts the response, from human rights defenders, to "What factors make you feel secure and insecure?". This project was in collaboration with The Centre for Applied Human Rights at the University of York and was led by Dr. Alice Nah.

=== Google Doodle ===
In January 2020 Deena Mohamed was commissioned by Google to make Mufidah Abdul Rahman's 106th Birthday Doodle.

=== YouTube "Yoodle" ===
In May, 2025 Mohamed was commissioned to make a "Yoodle" celebrating the Arab dessert kunafa. The doodle appeared on YouTube's homepage exclusively in the Middle East, Europe, Australia, and New Zealand on May 18, 2025. It was illustrated by Mohamed and animated by freelance 2D animator Katherine Pryor.

== Awards and recognition ==
Best Graphic Novel and the Grand Prize at Cairo Comix Festival in 2017, for her first installment of Shubeik Lubeik. In 2019 Mohamed received a McDowell fellowship for literature.

Shubeik Lubeik has received widespread media praise.

== Publications ==
- Shubeik Lubeik 1. Dar al-Mahrousa, Cairo, Egypt, 2018.
- Shubeik Lubeik 2. Dar al-Mahrousa, Cairo, Egypt, 2019.
- Shubeik Lubeik 3. Dar al-Mahrousa, Cairo, Egypt, 2021.

=== Translations ===
- Shubeik Lubeik (US)/Your Wish Is My Command (UK), collecting all three installments of the series, translated by Deena Mohamed. Pantheon (US) and Granta Books (UK), 2023.
  - Translations are also forthcoming in French, Italian, and Farsi.
