= Winnipeg Comiccon =

Multi-genre fan convention in Winnipeg, Canada

- Status: Active
- Venue: RBC Convention Centre Winnipeg
- Locations: Winnipeg, Manitoba
- Country: Canada
- Inaugurated: 2021
- Attendance: >35,000 in 2026
- Organizer: Capeflow Productions
- Website: https://comicconwinnipeg.com/

The Winnipeg Comiccon is an annual fan convention with a focus on comics, sci-fi, horror, wrestling, anime, and games. It is held at the RBC Convention Centre Winnipeg in Winnipeg, taking place on the last weekend of October typically adjacent to or over Halloween and lasting three days. Winnipeg Comiccon was launched in 2021 by Capeflow Productions after the organizer of the Central Canada Comic Con (C4) announced that it would not hold a convention in 2019 or 2020. Despite the two conventions' separate organizers, Winnipeg Comiccon is regarded to be a successor to C4 owing to its similar scheduling in the year.

== History ==
In April 2019, it was announced in what would've been its 25th year that the former Central Canada Comic Con was going on hiatus, and it was later announced on September 24 that C4 would be permanently dissolved, which would've left Winnipeg with only Ai-Kon as its sole major fan convention.

To fill the void, Capeflow Productions, the producers of the Montreal Comiccon, Ottawa Comiccon, and Comiccon de Quebec announced in November 2019 that they would be putting on a new convention called Winnipeg Comiccon. Its inaugural event was originally to have taken place on October 30 through November 1, 2020, however, it was postponed to 2021 due to the coronavirus pandemic. The inaugural 2021 event took place on October 29th through 31st, with attendees being required to wear masks and present verification of coronavirus vaccination as per the Manitoba government's gathering restrictions of the time, which were later dropped from 2022 onwards.

Since its launch, the convention has regularly managed to field dozens of celebrity screen actors, voice actors, and comic book authors from various pop culture franchises.

=== Event history ===
Dates	Location	Attendance	Guests
October 29–31, 2021	RBC Convention Centre Winnipeg; Winnipeg, Manitoba	14,000	
October 28–30, 2022	RBC Convention Centre Winnipeg; Winnipeg, Manitoba	28,000	Celebrity guests: Bruce Campbell (Guest of Honour), Cerina Vincent (cancelled), Charles Martinet, Dave Foley (cancelled), Garrett Wang, Gianni DeCenzo (cancelled), John Barrowman, John DiMaggio, Kevin McDonald, Lea Thompson, Lou Ferrigno (cancelled), Matthew Lewis (Guest of Honour), Peter Elbling (cancelled), Ruth Connell, Ted Raimi (cancelled) Guest artists: Aaron Reynolds, Arthur Suydam, Bryce Nelson, Dave McCaig, David Robertson, Donovan Yaciuk, GMB Chomichuk, Henry J. Barajas, Justin Currie, Lovern Kindzierski, S.M. Beiko, Scott Henderson
October 27–29, 2023	RBC Convention Centre Winnipeg; Winnipeg, Manitoba	>30,000	
October 25–27, 2024	RBC Convention Centre Winnipeg; Winnipeg, Manitoba	35,000	
October 24–26, 2025	RBC Convention Centre Winnipeg; Winnipeg, Manitoba	?	
October 30 – November 1, 2026	RBC Convention Centre Winnipeg; Winnipeg, Manitoba	>35,000	Celebrity guests: Amanda Tapping, Brandon Rogers, Casper Van Dien, Catherine Tate (Guest of Honour), Dina Meyer, Elizabeth Maxwell, Emily Kinney, Eric Johnson, Erica Durance, Famke Janssen (cancelled), Giancarlo Esposito (cancelled), Jake Busey, Jason Liebrecht, Jaz Sinclair (cancelled), Jodelle Ferland, Julian Richings, Laura Vandervoort, Lexa Doig, Mark Sheppard (Guest of Honour), Michael Ironside (cancelled), Michael Shanks, Nhut Le, Richard Dean Anderson (Guest of Honour), Robert Patrick, Steven Ogg, Troy Baker (cancelled), Veronica Taylor Guest artists: Anthony Ruttgaizer, Bart Sears, Bernard Chang, Chris Chuckry, Connor MacGregor, David Finch (cancelled), Donovan Yaciuk, Emilia Strilchuk, Eric Vedder, Gary Pullin, Hope Nicholson, Hugh Rookwood, Ian Boothby, James Dickson, Jeff Burton, Jeff Spokes, Kalman Andrasofszky, Kevin Maguire, Marcus To, Mike Rooth, Mostafa Moussa, Pia Guerra, Ramón Pérez, Richard Comely, Rick Leonardi, S.M. Carter, Sami Francis, Tom Grummett Featured wrestlers: Kurt Angle, Mick Foley
October 29–31, 2027	RBC Convention Centre Winnipeg; Winnipeg, Manitoba		

== See also ==
- List of comic book conventions
- Central Canada Comic Con (C4), organized by River City Conventions Inc. until 2018
- Ai-Kon, Winnipeg's anime convention
