= Fantasy Basel - The Swiss Comic Con =

Fantasy Basel – The Swiss Comic Con is a swiss Popculture etc. convention

Fantasy Basel – The Swiss Comic Con
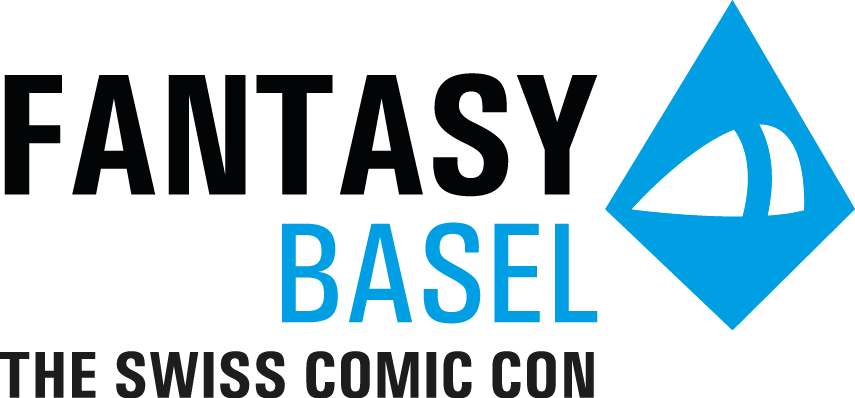
- Status: Active
- Genre: Comic, Cosplay, Film, TV, Gaming, Pop culture, Fantasy, Anime, Manga, Digital entertainment
- Frequency: Annually
- Venue: Messe Basel
- Locations: Basel, Switzerland
- Previous event: May 14-16, 2026
- Next event: May 15-17, 2027
- Attendance: 103,000
- Website: www.fantasybasel.ch/en

The Fantasy Basel - The Swiss Comic Con is a Swiss convention for film, fantasy, game, comic and cosplay fans. It was first held in Basel from May 14–16, 2015, and has been held annually since then, with the exception of 2020 due to the COVID-19 pandemic. With now more than 100,000 m^{2} of space, it is one of the largest pop culture conventions in Europe.

== Programme ==
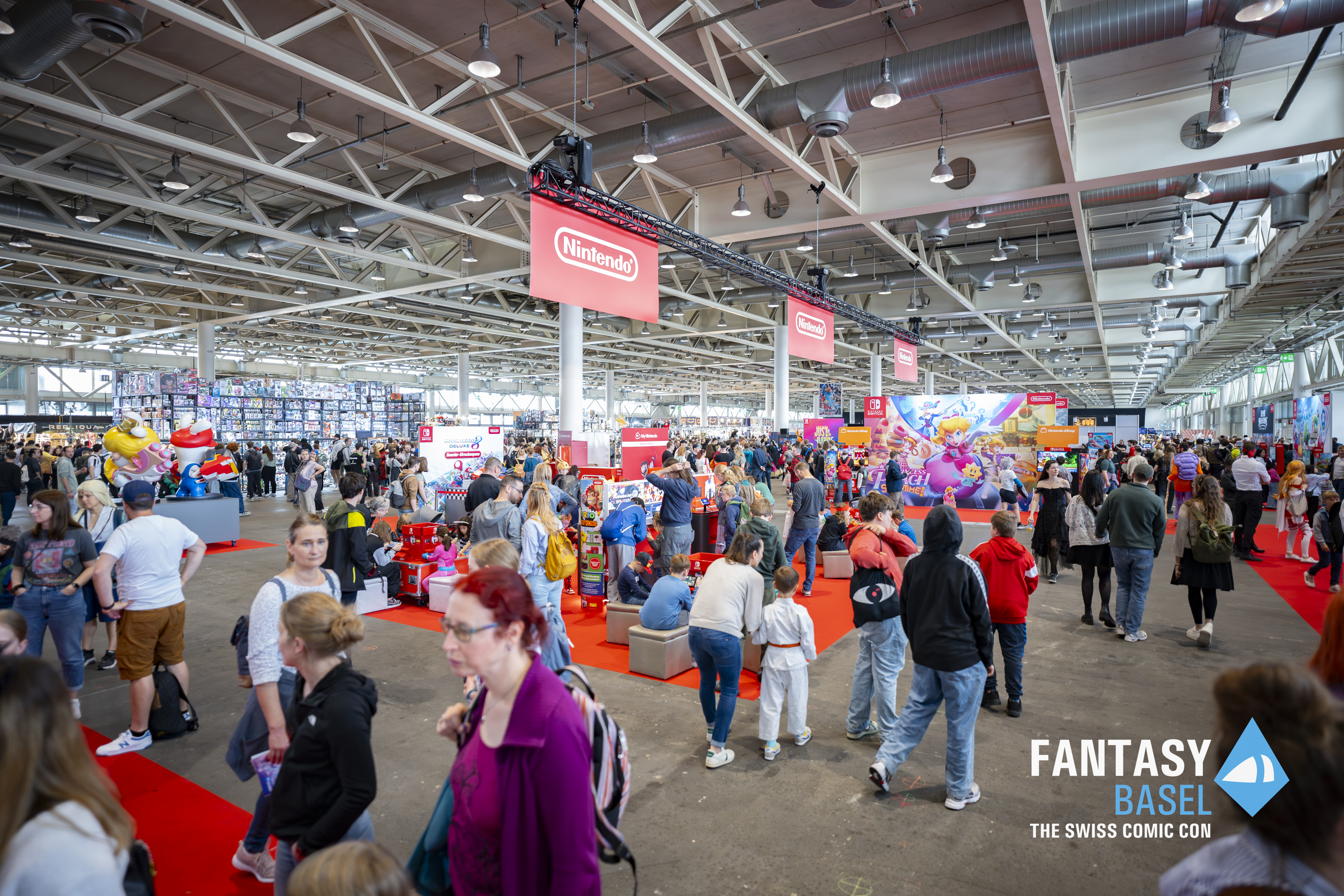
Nintendo Zone and Merchandise Area (Image: FANTASY BASEL - The Swiss Comic Con 2024)

International guests from Hollywood, the film and TV world, fantasy and comics, and the international cosplay scene can be seen on the stages and at autograph sessions and photo sessions. Over 300 illustrators, tattoo artists and urban artists can be met annually at Artist Alley. Cosplay competitions, exhibitions, panel discussions, workshops, premieres, live art shows, game worlds and medieval and steampunk are all part of the program. A hall is dedicated to e-sports as well as gaming, and board games, tabletop and role-playing games are also represented.

== History ==
The first Fantasy Basel - The Swiss Comic Con 2015 attracted more than 20,000 visitors. In the second year, the area was expanded from 15,000 m^{2} to 30,000 m^{2}. In 2017, the area was finally increased by another 20,000 m^{2} and the convention recorded a total of 43,000 visitors. In 2018, the event took place on 60,000 m^{2} for the first time. The fifth anniversary of Fantasy Basel - The Swiss Comic Con took place from May 3 to May 5, 2019, and recorded over 54,000 visitors. In 2020, the festival was held virtually. For its twelfth edition in 2026, the festival welcomed around 103,000 visitors.

== Organizer and venue ==
The convention was founded by Martin Schorno, the organizer is FantasyCon AG in Zurich. Fantasy Basel - The Swiss Comic Con takes place in the halls of Messe Basel.

== Convention statistics ==
Year	Period	Visitors	Exhibition space	Sources
2015	14.05.2015. – 16.05.2015.	20.000	15.000 m^{2}	
2016	05.05.2016 – 07.05.2016	30.000	30.000 m^{2}	
2017	29.04.2017 – 01.05.2017	43.000	50.000 m^{2}	
2018	10.05.2018 – 12.05.2018	52.000	60.000 m^{2}	
2019	03.05.2019 – 05.05.2019	54.000	60.000 m^{2}	
2020	held virtually			
2021	08.10.2021 – 10.10.2021	45.000	70.000 m^{2}	
2022	26.05.2022 – 28.05.2022	62.000	70.000 m^{2}	
2023	18.05.2023 – 20.05.2023	72.000	77.000 m^{2}	
2024	09.05.2024 – 11.05.2024	88'000	90.000 m^{2}	
2025	29.05.2025 – 31.05.2025	97'000	100.000 m^{2}	
2026	14.05.2026 – 16.05.2026	103'000	100.000 m^{2}	

== Guests ==
Every year since it was first held, the convention has featured several guests from different creative industries:

- Kevin Sussman (The Big Bang Theory)
- Graham McTavish (The Hobbit, Outlander, The Witcher)
- Kristian Nairn (Game of Thrones)
- Cara Buono (Stranger Things, Mad Men, The Sopranos)
- Evie Templeton (Wednesday)
- Natalia Tena (Game of Thrones and Harry Potter)
- Tom Wlaschiha (Stranger Things, Game of Thrones)
- Ricky Whittle (The 100)
- Ed Speleers (Eragon, Downtown Abbey, Outlander)
- Adelaide Kane (Reign, Grey's Anatomy, Once Upon A Time)
- Anna Popplewell (The Chronicles of Narnia, Reign, Halo 4: Forward Unto Dawn)
- Daniel Portman (Game of Thrones)
- Duncan Lacroix (Outlander, Vikings)
- Georgia Hirst (Vikings)
- Dan Fogler (Fantastic Beasts, The Walking Dead)
- Alison Sudol (Fantastic Beasts, A Fine Frenzy)
- David Haydn-Jones (Supernatural)
- Alfred Enoch (Harry Potter and How to Get Away with Murder)
- Martin Klebba (Pirates of the Caribbean)
- Sean Pertwee (Gotham, Elementary)
- Carla Juri (Blade Runner 2049)
- Angus MacInnes (Star Wars)
- Ian Beattie (Game of Thrones)
- Kiran Shah
- Didier Queloz (Nobel Prize winner, astronomer)
- Coldmirror
