= Egycon =

Speculative fiction convention in Cairo, Egypt

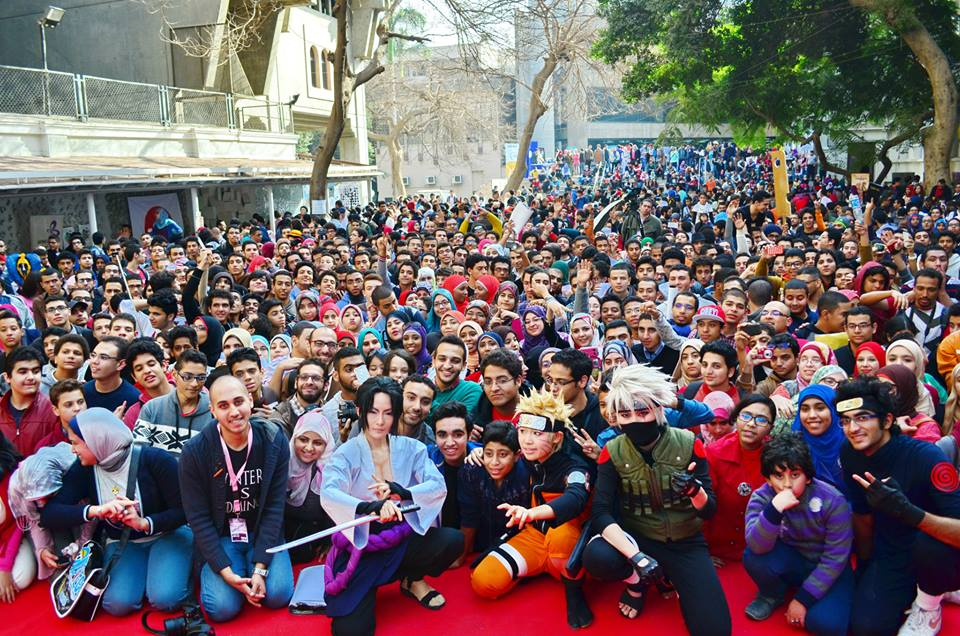
- Cosplayers gathered in The GrEEK Campus for Egycon 2015.
- Status: Active
- Genre: Multigenre
- Venue: Various: El Sawy Culture Wheel (2014); The GrEEK Campus (2015 - 2020); El-Shams Sporting Club (2017); Family Park (2021 - current); Club 7, Maadi (2024)
- Location: Cairo
- Country: Egypt
- Inaugurated: 2014
- Most recent: EGYCON Halloween III: October 30th, 2026
- Attendance: 1,650 (2014); 2,300 (2015); 3,200 (2016)
- Organizer: Egycon

Egycon (Arabic: ايجيكون) (stylized as EGYCON or EGYcon) is a speculative fiction convention held annually in Cairo, Egypt. Starting in 2013 with a series of mini meet-ups, the first large scale Egycon happened in 2014. Though starting as an anime-only convention, Egycon's scope quickly expanded to encompass several genres of media. Egycon has had articles written about it in Daily News Egypt, Cairo Scene, Arab News, ComicsGate and IGN. Every year, The Japan Foundation participates in the event.

== History ==
The first Egycon in 2014 was held at El Sawy Culture Wheel. Despite a lack of advertisement and there only being a Facebook event listing, the official attendance reported was 1,650. This was the only Egycon held at El Sawy Culture Wheel.

In 2015, Egycon moved to The GrEEK Campus, where it would stay until 2020, with the exception of Egycon 4 (2017), which was held at El Shams Sporting Club, Heliopolis. In 2021, Egycon changed venues to Family Park, New Cairo, where its currently still held, with the exception of Egycon 11 (2024), which was held in Club 7, Maadi.

== Events ==
Although Egycon only happens once a year, there are other events under the Egycon moniker which occur within the same year as the official event.

=== Cairo Cosplay Party ===
The Cairo Cosplay Party is an event hosted by Egycon, occurring irregularly. Starting in 2015 as the Summer Cosplay Party, it would happen annually from 2015 to 2019, before going on hiatus between 2020 and 2021. It then returned for 2022 and 2023. What sets apart Egycon and the Cairo Cosplay Party is the cosplay contest, where people perform acts of their choosing in cosplay for a cash prize. This cash prize can go as high as 20,000 EGP. The Cairo Cosplay Party has been held in the GrEEK Campus and in Family Park.

Egycon Halloween

Egycon has held three Halloween events, which have been held annually from 2024 to 2026. These events have had distinct themes that have set them apart from other Egycon events, including Halloween decorations and escape rooms.

=== Other events ===
On April 21, 2016, Egycon held a "57357 Cosplay Day" for funding cancer treatment in partnership with the Children's Cancer Hospital Foundation. Egycon has also held several Esports events.
