= Pensacola Comic Convention =

Pensacola, Florida gaming, comics, paranormal, and anime convention

Coordinates: 30.4728°N 87.3121°W

Pensacola Comic Convention (Pensacola Comic Con)
- Status: Active
- Genre: Science fiction, Horror, Fantasy, Gaming, Paranormal, Anime
- Venue: Pensacola Interstate Fair Grounds
- Locations: Pensacola, Florida
- Country: United States
- Inaugurated: 2010
- Organizer: Ericka Boussarhane, Founder.
- Website: http://www.pensacolacomiccon.com

Pensacola Comic Convention (Pensacola Comic Con; formerly known as Pensacola Para Con Comic Convention) was founded in the Fall of 2010 by psychic medium Ericka Boussarhane. The convention is for fans of science fiction, horror, fantasy, gaming, anime, costuming, fan films, and indie films held annually in Pensacola, Florida. The event is owned by Pensacola Comic Convention LLC. The event offers celebrity meet and greets, discussion panels, workshops, film screenings, film festivals, demonstrations, costume contests, and competitions. The event also offers investigations at local historic haunted locations such as the Pensacola Victorian Inn, The Pensacola Light House, the Pensacola Gray House, and the Pensacola Little Theater. A portion of the proceeds of the event are donated to Ronald McDonald House Charities. The convention is the first female African American owed comic convention in the USA.

== Sources ==
- Ross, Rebecca. "Chip off the old block" "Pensacola News Journal", Retrieved on Mar. 13, 2009.
- Moon, Troy "Take a walk on the weird side Spice up your summer UFO tours and ghost walks" "Pensacola News Journal" Retrieved on Jul. 10, 2009
- McKeon, Jennie "Ghost Hunting in Downtown Pensacola" "Inweekly Newspaper" Retrieved on September 15, 2010
- Ross, Rebecca " Nothing 'normal' at this gathering" "Pensacola News Journal" Retrieved Sept 20, 2010.
- Staff Writer " Pensacola: Is Pensacola Haunted?" "Trip Advisor" Retrieved 2010
- Moon, Troy Troy Moon " All things paranormal coming town" "Pensacola News Journal" Retrieved Oct. 11, 2011
- Staff Writer "Pensacola Para Con 2011Ghost Hunting, Sci-Fi Convention " "Fox 10 News" Retrieved Oct 11 2011.
- Geek Admin "Florida Geek Scene", Retrieved June 15, 2012
- Staff Writer " Fun at Paracon event anything but normal" "Splash" Magazine" Retrieved Sept 1 2012
- Staff Writer "Pensacola Paracon Sept. 22-23 at Pensacola Fairgrounds " "Mullet Wrapper Newspaper" Retrieved September 18, 2012
- Staff writer " Ghosts paranormal activity at 2012 Pensacola Para Con" "WEAR TV 3 News" Retrieved September 23, 2012
- Cooper, Josh "Pensacola Paracon offers a walk on the weird side" "Pensacola News Journal" Retrieved Sep. 24, 2012
- Medina, Kristina "Pensacola Paracon beckons those seeking paranormal experience" "The Voyager" Retrieved April 13, 2013
- Barnwell, Alison " Spring Hill man builds 'Lone Ranger' diorama with Legos" "Tampa Bay Times Newspaper" Retrieved July 3, 2013
- Staff writer "DANCE, DANCE PARA-CON Fans of zombies, the paranormal, and horror films have reason to rejoice:" "Inweekly Newspaper", Retrieved July 3, 2013
- Robinson, Kevin "Para-Con is sci-fi paradise" "Pensacola News Journal" Retrieved Aug 18, 2013
- Pillion, Dennis "Pensacola Para Con bringing 'geek paradise' to the Panhandle this weekend" "Al.com Newspaper" Retrieved August 14, 2013
- Diaz, Julio "Scare up some fun at Pensacola Para-Con" "Pensacola News Journal" Retrieved Aug 16, 2013
- Pillion, Dennis " Newspaper Zombies, comic characters, costume buffs turn out in droves at Pensacola Para Con " "Al.com Newspaper" Retrieved August 17, 2013
- Pillion, Dennis "This weekend at the beach: Blues music, Friday night lights, and more cosplay" "Al.com Newspaper" Retrieved August 23, 2013
- BGG Staff "Meet Your Favorite Film & TV Stars At Pensacola Para Con " "BGG After Dark", Retrieved March 2014
- Moon, troy "Paranormal, sci-fi convention returns " "Pensacola News Journal" Retrieved July 1, 2014
- Staff Writer "It's not Pensacon, It's Para Con" "Pensacola News Journal" Retrieved July 2, 2014
- Staff writer "Incredible Hulk in Pensacola" "Destin Log Newspaper" Retrieved July 11, 2014
- Easton, Ed cultured/12698469/ "Barnes & Noble in Pensacola kicks off its Get Pop-Cultured series Friday. " "Pensacola News Journal" Retrieved July 15, 2014
- Staff Writer " The Incredible Hulk will be at Pensacola" "Mullet Wrapper Newspaper" Retrieved July 23, 2014
- Staff Writer "Explore Pensacola Para Con" "Splash! Magazine" Retrieved Aug 1, 2014
- Staff Writer "PENSACOLA PARA CON" "Inweekly Newspaper" Retrieved August 6, 2014
- Staff writer "Arc Gateway presents at Pensacola Paracon " "WEAR TV 3 News" Retrieved Aug 6 2014
- Pillion, Dennis Pensacola
- Moon, Troy " Lou Ferrigno, C. Thomas Howell at Para Con" Pensacola News Journal Retrieved Aug 8 2014
- Staff writer "Pensacola Paracon kicks off" "WEAR TV 3 News" Retrieved Aug 9 2014
- Emer, Joe " Pensacola Paracon kicks off this weekend and promises to be a blast" Fox 10 NewsRetrieved Aug 2014
- Hoeger, Rebekah "Para Con in Pensacola hosts 143 vendors" Fox 10 News Retrieved Aug 2014
- Moon, Troy "Hulk and heat" "Pensacola News Journal" Retrieved Aug 10, 2014
- Little, Aaron "Paracon Mania" Santa Rosa Press Gazette" Retrieved August 14, 2014
- Staff Writer "Pensacola Para Con" "Inweekly Newspaper" Retrieved August 17, 2014.
- Terefenko, Veronica "Pensacola Comic Con coming in August" "Pensacola News Journal" Retrieved July 12, 2016
- Girod, Brandon "First-timers Guide: Pensacola Comic Con" "Pensacola News Journal" Retrieved Aug. 18, 2016
- Girod, Brandon "Geek out this weekend at Pensacola Comic Con" "Pensacola News Journal" Retrieved Aug. 17, 2016

Pensacola Comic Convention Trademark Pensacola Comic Con Trademark Pensacola Comic-Con Trademark
