= RBC Convention Centre Winnipeg =

Building in Winnipeg, Canada

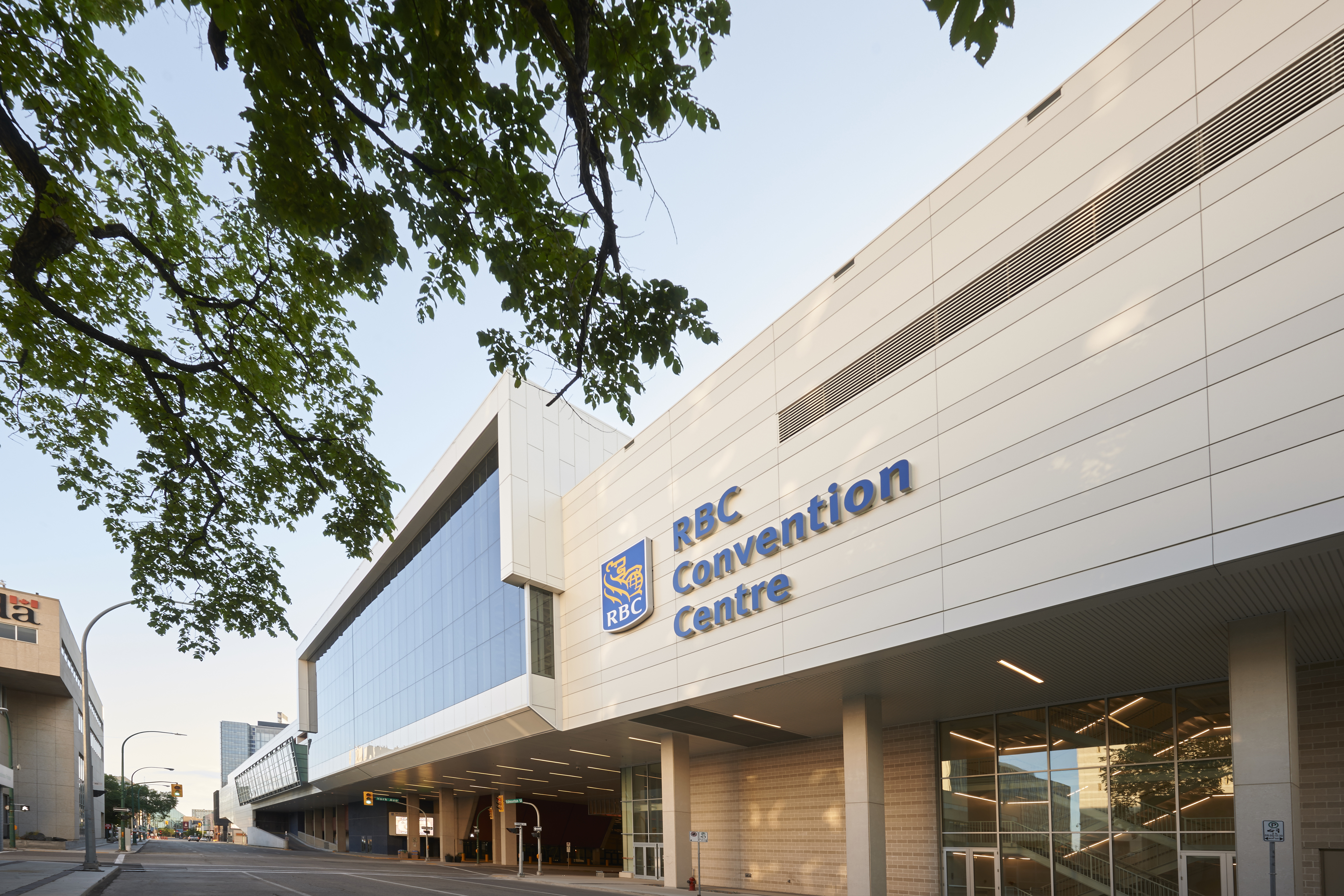
- RBC Convention Centre Winnipeg
- Interactive map of RBC Convention Centre Winnipeg
- Former names: Winnipeg Convention Centre (1975–2013)
- Location: Winnipeg, Manitoba, Canada
- Coordinates: 49.8891187°N 97.1447611°W
- Owner: Convention Centre Corporation

Construction
- Opened: 1975
- Expanded: 2015
- Cost: C$25 million ($142 million in 2025 dollars)

Website
- wcc.mb.ca

The RBC Convention Centre Winnipeg (formerly the Winnipeg Convention Centre) is a major meeting and convention centre located in downtown Winnipeg, Manitoba, Canada.

It has five levels including indoor parking for 729 vehicles, and three levels of various meeting trade show space totalling 260,000 square feet (24,000 m^{2}). The main exhibit hall has 131,000 square feet (12,200 m^{2}) of pillar-less space.

The convention centre is connected to the Winnipeg Walkway system via a skywalk connection crossing St. Mary Avenue and Hargrave Street, connecting the venue to the neighbouring Delta hotel, Cityplace, and Canada Life Centre.

== History ==
The convention centre was recommended as part of the Metropolitan Corporation of Greater Winnipeg (Metro) Downtown Development Plan of 1969.

Metro and the Province of Manitoba announced the $35-million Winnipeg Convention Centre on 10 September 1970. Always in opposition to metropolitan government, Mayor of Winnipeg Stephen Juba did not attend the announcing press conference.

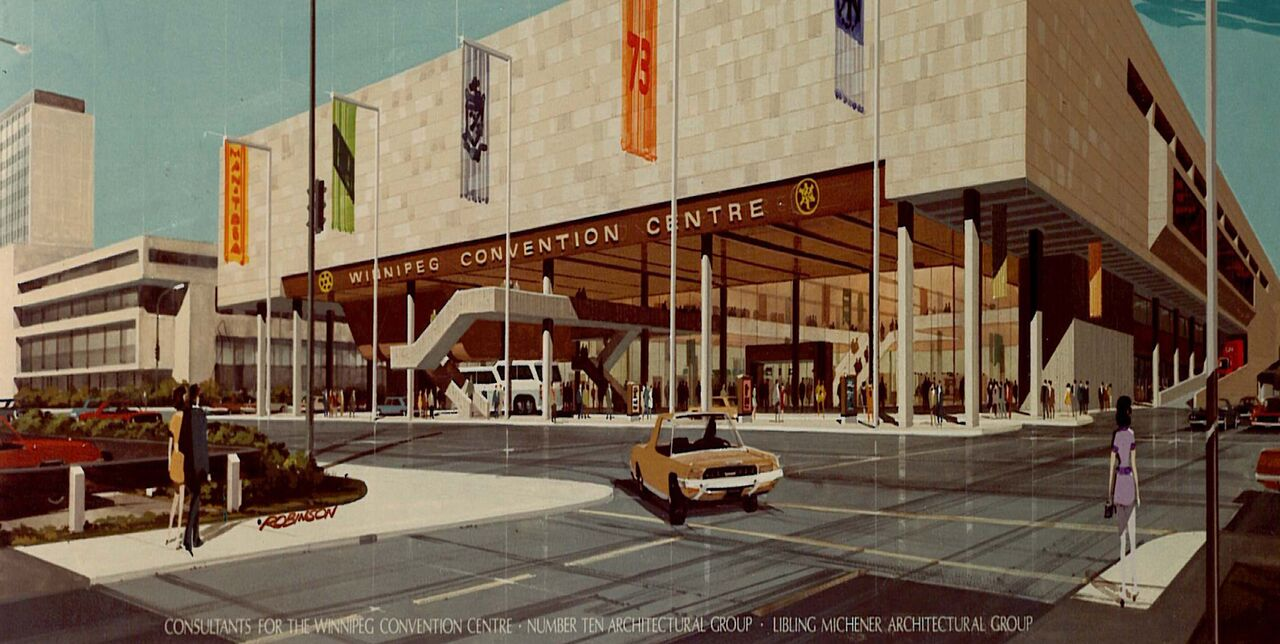
Winnipeg Convention Centre, 1974

Originally named the Winnipeg Convention Centre, the publicly-owned facility was built and opened in 1975. The building, designed by Canadian architect Isadore (Issie) Coop, of the Number Ten Architectural Group, was among the first "purpose-built" convention centre of its kind built in Canada.

Aside from trade shows and conventions, the Convention Centre has also been used as a sports venue and was home to the Winnipeg Cyclone basketball team from 1995 to 2001.

A $180-million expansion, completed between 2012 and 2015, roughly doubled the size of the facility, adding 131,000 square feet (12,200 m^{2}) of exhibit space and underground parking. In July 2013, the facility was rebranded as the RBC Convention Centre Winnipeg after its naming rights were purchased by Royal Bank of Canada. By 2017, the annual visitor count to the RBC Convention Centre had increased by about 50,000 to 557,000, which was directly related to the expansion.

== Events ==
The Winnipeg Convention Centre hosts regularly scheduled annual events such as a New Years' Eve dinner and dance, a Christmas crafts show known as the "Signatures Handmade Market", the Mid-Canada Boat Show, the Manitoba RV Show and Sale, the Winnipeg Career Fair, the Home & Garden Show (formerly Home Expression Show), the Winnipeg Comicon Show, a Wedding Show.

The convention centre has hosted pop culture events such as the anime convention Ai-Kon, Central Canada Comic Con until 2019, and its spiritual successor Winnipeg Comiccon since 2021. It hosted Pemmi-Con—the 15th North American Science Fiction Convention—in 2023.

In January 2021, the convention centre operated as a "super site" for COVID-19 vaccinations. In 2026, it hosted the New Democratic Party leadership election.
