= Qahera =

2013 Webcomic by Deena Mohamed

- The character Qahera flying
- Author: Deena Mohamed
- Website: qaherathesuperhero.com
- Current status/schedule: Concluded
- Launch date: 2013

Qahera is a 2013 webcomic produced by then-art student Deena Mohamed. The eponymous protagonist, a hijab-clad superheroine, is an Egyptian superhero. The series, which began as a joke amongst friends but soon became a viral phenomenon, deals with issues such as sexual harassment, misogyny, Islamophobia, and Islamist cultural attitudes, all often within the context of the 2012–13 Egyptian protests.

== Development ==
"Groped by the comic strip's villains, Layla's hopes of police assistance are dashed when an officer castigates her for wearing inappropriate clothing -- trousers and a sweater. Back on the street, she's confronted by another gang of tormentors and is saved only when Qahera appears, beating them with a stick and then stringing them by the scruff of their necks from the police station railings."

–Bloomberg.com describing a Qahera storyline

"Qahera", the feminine version of "qaher", means conqueror, vanquisher, or triumphant; القاهرة (al-Qāhirah or al-Qahera) is the Arabic for the city Cairo itself, where the story takes place. Mohamed named the character as such because of its powerful meanings and because of its direct reference to Egypt. In an interview with The Daily Beast, Mohamed said that the name struck her very fitting "because it has so many powerful meanings: vanquisher, destroyer, omnipotent. It's a great name for a superhero, honestly, especially one who faces as many challenges as she does." Mohamed was inspired to start creating Qahera out of frustration with misogyny, but stated that one "can't critique [Egyptian] society without someone else trying to co-opt it and claiming they want to save you, or that you live in a backwards society." Mohamed described the character Qahera as "someone who was willing to take a stand against both the problems we have and people who try to impose their own views onto us." The character was initially intended to combat Islamophobia as well, and Mohamed gave her the hijab for that reason.

In the commentary for the first Qahera comic, Mohamed wrote that "an evening of reading the most awful misogynistic articles on dumb Islamic websites has led [her] to this." The majority of the themes and events in the webcomic are based on Mohamed's own experiences with street harassment. She said that Qahera is "everything I'd have liked to be," and that the character is partially modeled after the many women around her. Aimed at a Western audience, Qahera is published primarily in English and translated into colloquial Egyptian Arabic.

== Impact and reception ==
Between September and November 2013, Mohamad's website had nearly 500,000 unique visitors, with an average of 10,000 hits per day. Mohamed had been contacted by local publishers to create a printed version of the webcomic. Mohamed also reported getting daily messages from Arab women who say that Qahera had been an inspiration for them.

Qahera was met with enthusiastic response, as its novel treatment and representation of women in hijab received praise and academic interest. Scholars such as such as Winona Landis have noted that Qahera counters violent media representations in the post 9/11 context. Reviewers described the webcomic as "dynamic, thoughtful, and witty," with "a new kind of superheroine with a visible difference." Bitch magazine credits Qahera's popularity to its new representation of Muslim women, as "Qahera embodies Egyptian women's ability to cultivate their own meaning of 'feminism', and their own power to defeat sexism and the problems that come with it." This different bodily representation is central to understanding Qahera's power as her hijab becomes another weapon against western prejudice and Arab patriarchy. Being visible and vocal is Qahera's most emphatic superpower.

== See also ==
- Islam in Egypt
- Ms. Marvel (Kamala Khan)
