= Pensacola News Journal =

Newspaper in Florida

Coordinates: 30.41121°N 87.21287°W

- The July 15, 2010 front page of the Pensacola News Journal
- Type: Daily regional middle-market newspaper
- Format: Broadsheet
- Owner: USA Today Co.
- Editor: Lisa Nellessen-Savage
- Founded: 1889
- Headquarters: 101 N E Street; Pensacola, Florida 32502; United States
- Circulation: 4,928 Average print circulation 1,198 Digital Subscribers
- OCLC number: 54453673
- Website: pnj.com

The Pensacola News Journal is a morning daily newspaper based in Pensacola, serving Escambia and Santa Rosa counties in Florida. It is Northwest Florida's most widely read daily.

The News Journal is owned by USA Today Co., a national media holding company that owns newspapers such as USA Today and the Arizona Republic, among others.

== History ==
The heritage of the News Journal can be traced back to 1889, when a group of Pensacola businessmen founded the Pensacola Daily News. The Daily News printed its first issue on 5 March 1889, with an initial circulation of 2,500 copies. Then, in March 1897, a Pensacolian named M. Loftin founded a newsweekly, the Pensacola Journal. The Journal converted to a daily format a year later.

The two dailies competed fiercely, each driving the other to edge of bankruptcy in the struggle to be recognised as Pensacola's top daily newspaper. By 1922, the Journal was in dire financial trouble, and was eventually purchased by New York City businessman John Holliday Perry, who at about the same time also acquired papers in Jacksonville and Panama City. Two years later, Perry bought the Daily News and merged the two newspapers' operations. For the next six decades, the Pensacola Journal continued to appear mornings and the Pensacola News afternoons, with a combined Sunday edition as the Pensacola News Journal.

John H. Perry developed the News Journal into an extremely popular and successful newspaper. By the early 1950s, the News Journal had developed into one of the most modern and efficient newspaper operations in the Southeast. Under the leadership of Perry's son, John Holliday Perry Jr., who succeeded his father in 1952, the News Journal continued to expand. Perry Publications, Inc., eventually owned 28 newspapers throughout Florida.

On July 1, 1969, the younger Perry announced he was selling the News and the Journal to Gannett, then based in Rochester, New York, for $15.5 million.

Like many U.S. afternoon newspapers in the post-war period, the News sustained declining circulation. Finally, in 1985, the News and Journal merged into a single morning newspaper under the News Journal name.

The paper gained nationwide notoriety in 1997 and 1998 with a series of investigative reports about the Brownsville Revival at the Brownsville Assembly of God. The paper had initially written glowing reports about the revival, but after former members told the paper that all was not as it appeared, the News Journal began a four-month investigation that revealed the revival had been "well planned and orchestrated" from the very start. It also called many of the claims made by the church's leaders into question, and delved heavily into the church's finances.

The News Journal had a peak daily circulation of 64,041 and a Sunday circulation of 81,633 in 2002, declining to a daily circulation of 29,981 and a Sunday circulation of 47,892 in 2015.

After over a century, the production departments moved to Mobile, Ala., on 2 June 2009.

In August 2014, the Pensacola News Journal moved to its new headquarters at 2 N. Palafox St. The longtime headquarters at 101 E. Romana St. was demolished in 2015 by its new owners, Quint Studer's Daily Convo, who will build apartments, retail shops and a new YMCA on the site. In mid-2023, Pensacola News Journal moved out of the 2 N. Palafox St. building. The new mailing address is 101 N E Street according to the contact us page on pnj.com.

In March 2024, the newspaper switched from carrier to postal delivery.

== Controversies ==
In 2021, the paper faced national backlash for an allegedly misogynistic cartoon drawn by its cartoonist, Andy Marlette. During the coverage of the backlash, allegations of racism arose against Marlette for a cartoon he drew while in college, including the use of racial epithets. Marlette was quoted as saying the objections of racism against him came solely from irrational and unreasonable readers. The coverage of the incident raised questions about the paper's hiring practices.

Marlette left the paper shortly after the controversy. It is unclear whether Marlette was fired.
