= Memphis Comic and Fantasy Convention =

The Memphis Comic and Fantasy Convention is an annual comic book convention that has taken place in Memphis, Tennessee since 2010. It typically occurs in early fall. The convention takes place over a period of three days, and has had notable guests including Tom Kenny (voice of SpongeBob SquarePants), Denise Crosby (of Star Trek), and others.

The event usually begins with a presentation by a notable figure in the comic book industry, and is then followed by three days of events at local Memphis venues, centering on a hotel. Schoolchildren are also able to attend the event and attend a "Geek 101" which included various hands-on activities.

In 2012, the convention was also the host of the Unreal Film Festival and Bricks & Heroes (a Lego conference).
