= Mantua Comics & Games =

Italian annual comic book and gaming convention

Coordinates: 45.167144°N 10.825514°E

Mantua Comics and Games
- Status: active
- Location: Mantua
- Country: Italy
- Inaugurated: 2006
- Attendance: 25,000 by 2014
- Website: mantovacomics.it

Mantua Comics & Games is an annual comic book and gaming convention in Mantua, Lombardy, northern Italy. The event takes place over three days, usually between the end of February and the beginning of March in the PalaBAM arena.

== History ==
Mantua Comics & Games was launched in 2006 in its current location, the PalaBAM indoor arena, between Friday 26 May 2006 and Sunday 28 May 2006. During the first annual event, it managed to attract around 15,000 visitors. It has since enjoyed steady growth and during its latest edition in 2014 entertained up to 25,000 guests overall.

It was the first Italian event to organize a specialty day dedicated to linking up-and-coming aspiring authors with experts in the field supported by many of the most important Italian publishers.

=== Guests ===
Each year Panini Comics/Marvel uses Mantua to announce as a national exclusive its publishing lineup for the next several months, hosting many national and international personalities throughout its preview press event.

During its run, the show has hosted Sergio Bonelli (son of Tex author Gian Luigi Bonelli), Jim Lee, Milo Manara, Leo Ortolani, Gabriele Dell'Otto, Brian Azzarello, Jill Thompson, Giuseppe Camuncoli, Will Dennis and J. G. Jones (with Mark Millar, co-creator of the comic series Wanted published in Italy by Panini). The fair also hosted several notable authors of historic fiction, young adult, and fantasy, including Licia Troisi, Alan D. Altieri, Gianluca Morozzi, Francesco Falconi, Luca Azzolini and Cecilia Randall.
