= The GrEEK Campus =

Technology and innovation park in Cairo, Egypt

Coordinates: 30.04399°N 31.23884°E

- الجريك كامبس
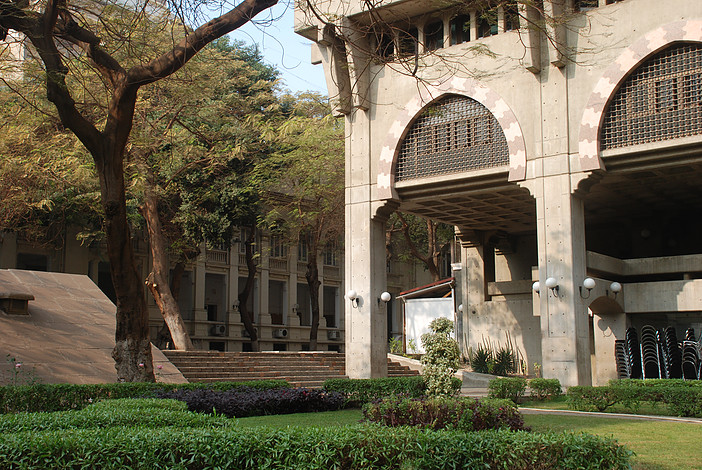
- Type: University campus, Technology Park
- Established: December 2013
- Founders: Ahmed El Alfi
- Affiliations: American University in Cairo
- Location: Tahrir Gate: 171 Tahrir Street, Downtown, Cairo; Falaki Gate: 28 Falaki Street, Downtown, Cairo
- Website: http://www.thegreekcampus.com/
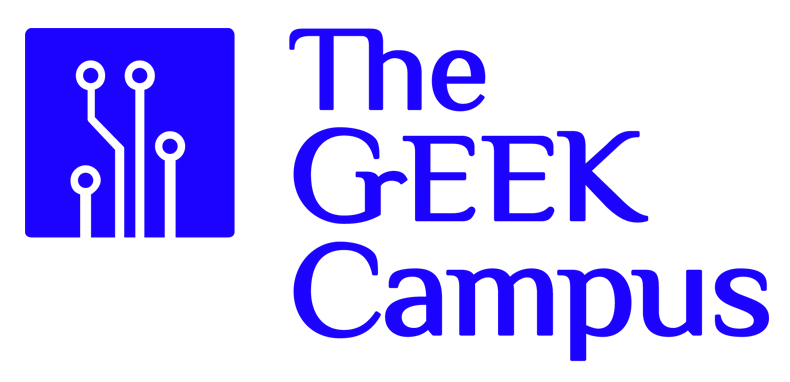

The GrEEK Campus, also GEEK Campus, is a technology park in Cairo, Egypt. The campus provides workspaces for rent, for startups, as well as established local and multinational companies. Located in Downtown Cairo, The GrEEK Campus consists of five office buildings with a total space of 25,000 m^{2}.

== History ==
The campus was created by the Egyptian businessman, Ahmed Elalfy.

In 1964, the campus was sold to the American University in Cairo (AUC) to expand and accommodate more students, where it was dubbed “The Greek Campus”. For 50 years it housed the AUC library, Social Sciences building and Jameel Center, among other buildings.

Upon AUC's relocation to another campus on the outskirts of Cairo in 2008, a long term rental contract was entered into with Tahrir Alley Technology Park (TATP), the operating company of The GrEEK Campus. This rental saw the park become Egypt's first ever technology park.

== Expansion ==
In mid-2019, The GrEEK Campus established a partnership with Monsha'at (the Small and Medium Enterprises General Authority) to manage the operations of Startup Hub Khobar in Saudi Arabia's Eastern Province.

In 2020, The GrEEK Campus launched its second location in Cairo, in Mall of Arabia's commercial workspaces in 6 October City, spanning 3 zones on a total area of 5,545 m^{2}.
