= AthensCon =

Annual convention in Athens, Greece

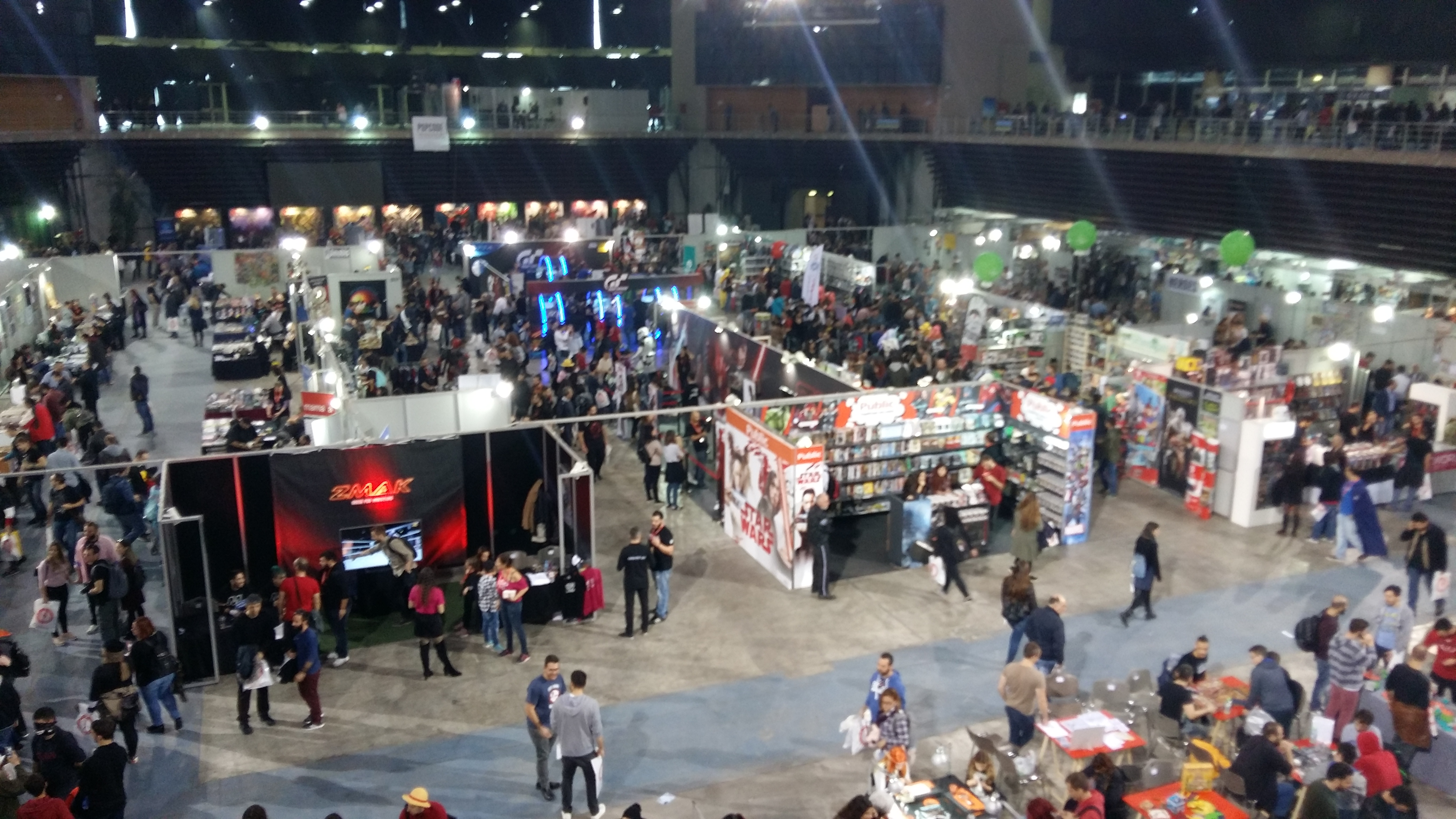
- AthensCon in 2017
- Status: Active
- Genre: Multi-genre
- Venue: The Olympic Tae Kwon Do Stadium
- Locations: Athens, Greece
- Country: Greece
- Inaugurated: November 14, 2015; 10 years ago
- Filing status: Non-profit
- Website: www.athenscon.gr/en/

AthensCon is a non-profit multi-genre entertainment and comic book convention held annually in Athens, Attica, Greece. AthensCon is the first large-scale comic book convention held in Greece. It was founded in 2015 and it is held annually in Athens for two days in the beginning of December.

== History and organization ==
The location where the convention takes place is the Olympic Tae Kwon Do Stadium ( Greek: Κλειστό Παλαιού Φαλήρου) which is located in the beach front of Athens and more specifically in the Faliron Delta at the end of Andrea Syngrou Avenue in close proximity to the Stavros Niarchos Foundation Cultural Centre (SNFCC). Currently AthensCon is one of the main conventions in the Balkan Peninsula and the Eastern Mediterranean. Furthermore, during the main event, there are also held seminars, competitions, mini-championships and other activities (such as cosplay gatherings, sword fights and retro video game exhibitions) where the visitors can participate themselves. Notable guests include: Eugenios Trivizas, Adrian_Paul, John Howe, Ian Whyte, Stefan Kapicic, Chris Achilleos, Erik J. Larsen, David Hine, Ron Marz, Steve Cardenas, Clive Russel, James O'Barr, Mark Waid and Miltos Yerolemou.

== See also ==
- Comic book convention
- Comic Art Convention
- Fandom
- Athens
- Science fiction convention
