= PerifaCon =

Comic convention in São Paulo, Brazil

PerifaCon, also informally called Comic Con da Favela (Favela Comic Con), is a comic book event held since 2019 in São Paulo with a focus on reaching mainly the public from the outskirts of São Paulo, who are hardly able to participate in large events such as CCXP due to cost and distance.

The name PerifaCon merges the terms "Perifa", slang for periferia, and "Con", which refers to comic cons. Periferia can be literally translated as "suburb", but in Brazilian Portuguese the term is used mainly for the areas of the metropolitan regions with the highest index of poverty and also for the favelas.

== History ==
The idea for PerifaCon emerged in September 2018 in a group of seven young black people from the periferia: Andreza Delgado, Igor Nogueira, Mateus Ramos, Matheus Polito, Luíze Tavares, Gabrielly Oliveira and Pedro Okuyama. The initial objective was to bring the experience of participating in a comic con to people who don't have access to this kind of event.

After six months of meetings, the organizers managed to get investors and sponsors, in addition to widespread media coverage, especially due to the unique nature of the project. There was even an advertising agency that was interested in buying the event, but the group responsible for PerifaCon insisted on keeping the event as an independent initiative. Most of the value of the event came through crowdfunding.

=== 1st PerifaCon ===
The first edition of the event was held on March 24, 2019, at Capão Redondo's Fábrica de Cultura, in the southwest region of São Paulo. There were sales and autographs of comics, RPG workshops, music presentations, lectures and a cosplay contest, among several other totally free activities. A total of 7,000 people attended the event, although only about 4,000 were able to enter the main area due to space limitations (with no previous experience in organizing events, the group responsible for PerifaCon had estimated that there would be only 2,000 visitors).

Among the exhibitions, the one that most attracted the public was the project created by illustrator Wagner Loud with YouTuber LØAD, who presented several illustrations that emulated comic book covers portraying Brazilian rappers as if they were superheroes. Among the musicians represented were Criolo, Sabotage, Negra Li, KL Jay and several others.

In addition to activities related to pop culture and the presence of artists such as Marcelo D'Salete, Ivan Reis, Rafael Calça, Jefferson Costa, Adriana Melo and Joe Prado, among others, there were also concerts by bands and dance groups from that region.

=== Brotando nas Redes ===
The second edition of PerifaCon was originally scheduled to take place on April 11–12, 2020 at Cidade Tiradentes' Centro de Formação Cultural, east of São Paulo. Due to the COVID-19 pandemic, the event was initially postponed to June 6–7 and then cancelled.

In 2021, still unable to hold the event in person, the organizers held a virtual festival entitled "PerifaCon, Brotando nas Redes" ("PerifaCon, appearing on the networks"). Between March 26 and 28, several thematic panels and training cycles for comics artists and illustrators were presented, with online activities both recorded and live. Entries were made free of charge on the official PerifaCon website and activities were presented through YouTube and social media.

A cosplay contest dedicated to the black community was also held, with 17 participants dressing up and playing pop culture characters, running for a prize with the winner being determined by popular vote. According to the definition of those responsible for the event, the main objective of the contest was "to promote, value and strengthen the identity and manifestations of peripheral, black and LGBTQI+ people in the universe of nerd, geek and pop entertainment".

== Narrativas Periféricas ==
During the 1st PerifaCon, the Narrativas Periféricas ("Peripheral Narratives") project was developed in a partnership between the event's organizers, Mino publishing house and Chiaroscuro Studios. The intention was to select comic artists from periferias who would publish a comic book or graphic novel with Mino. 200 works from all over Brazil were submitted, of which 18 were selected for an online experience coordinated by the editor Janaína de Luna and the comic book artist Pedro Cobiaco. The eight months of weekly classes had the participation, among others, of artists such as Shiko and the twins Fábio Moon and Gabriel Bá.

After the experience, six artists, four of whom were black, published their comics. The printing and launch of the books were made possible by crowdfunding through the Catarse platform. The books released were: Thomas: La Vie en Rose, by Arthur Pigs; Crianças Selvagens, by Gabú Brito; Quando a Música Acabar, by Isaque Sagara; Pomo, by Eryk Souza; Shin, by Isaac Santos; and Para Todos os Tipos de Vermes, by Kione Ayo.

In 2021, Narrativas Periféricas won the Troféu HQ Mix for Best Editorial Project. Also, two authors involved with the project were nominated in the New Talent categories: Gabú Brito as Writer and Penciller, and Isaac Santos as Penciller.

== Cultural producer ==
After their experience with the organization of the first edition of PerifaCon and the Narrativas Periféricas project, Andreza Delgado, Gabrielly Oliveira, Igor Nogueira and Luize Tavares opened the company PerifaCon Comunicação e Produção Cultural to organize the following editions of the event, do curatorship for professionals from the periferia, do curatorship for events and releases by major studios, in addition to consulting for large companies that want to strengthen relationships with periferia groups.

One of the curatorship actions was with the Brazilian McDonald's, with the selection of artists to be hired for the illustrations of the snack trays. Another work that gained prominence was the illustrations for the Brazilian launch of the Netflix series Cursed, to which artists Lya Nazura and Marília Marz were invited. For the streaming channel, PerifaCon also created the Na Boca do Povo show, where the four PerifaCon partners commented on matters related to the Netflix catalogue.

== Podcast ==
On September 13, 2019, the weekly podcast PerifaCon, o Podcast premiered, with the aim of debating topics related to pop culture and other subjects from the nerd and geek universes. The program is led by the same people responsible for organizing PerifaCon and the first episode talked about the first edition of the event and the initiatives and projects being developed by them.

Published every Friday, the program's format varies according to the topic, and can be a debate, roundtable, interview, etc. As of the second season, which began on June 17, 2020, the podcast started to count on the support of Spcine and the Municipal Department of Culture of São Paulo, with production by CLAV Music.
