= Alamo City Comic Con =

Pop culture convention in Texas

Coordinates: 29°25′17″N 98°29′2″W

- Status: Active
- Venue: Alamodome
- Locations: San Antonio, Texas
- Country: United States
- Inaugurated: 2013
- Website: alamocitycomiccon.com

Alamo City Comic Con (ACCC) is a pop culture convention that is annually held in downtown San Antonio, Texas, taking up the majority of the Henry B. Gonzalez Convention Center. ACCC brings top tier celebrities from the world of pop culture movies, TV, comics, video games and cosplay and is currently the largest convention in San Antonio as well as one of the largest events of its kind in the state of Texas. It is also one of the fastest-growing conventions in the United States, with approximately 73,000 attendees in 2014 and just over 78,000 in 2015. In 2014 director and producer Alejandro Cabrera followed and documented The Alamo City Comic Con and the surrounding community for his 2015 documentary, Syfytonians. The film was complete success locally and has credited for reinvigorating the company 2015 show turnover.

== History ==
ACCC was started in 2013 by a passionate comic and pop-culture fan Alfredo "Apple" De La Fuente. In this first year, Alamo City Comic Con managed to attract just over 34,000 people. South Texas con-goers took notice of their first year with guests like The Walking Dead's Steven Yeun (Glenn), Lauren Cohan (Maggie) and Chad Coleman (Tyreese). Joining them were other high-profile guests Sean Astin, Danny Trejo, Adam West and Burt Ward, and comic creators Rob Liefield and Neal Adams to name a few. The convention nearly doubled its numbers in 2014, making it one of the largest comic book conventions in the country, with guest of honor Stan Lee, Agent's of S.H.I.E.L.D.'s Clark Gregg, more Walking Dead cast members like Scott Wilson, Chandler Riggs, Emily Kinney among others. Year three of ACCC once again brought Stan Lee along with a Sons of Anarchy reunion that included Ron Perlman, Kim Coates, Tommy Flanagan, Mark Boone Junior, Ryan Hurst, Emilio Rivera and Michael Ornstein. In addition, celebrities Jon Bernthal, Michael Rooker, Ming Na Wen and director Robert Rodriguez joined the lineup.

=== Event history ===
Event name & Date	Venue & Location	Attendance	Convention Guests
October 25–27, 2013	Henry B. Gonzalez Convention Center; San Antonio, Texas	15,000	Steven Yeun, Lauren Cohan, Chad Coleman, Adam West, Burt Ward, Kevin Nash, Bret Hart, Danny Trejo
September 26–28, 2014	Henry B. Gonzalez Convention Center; San Antonio, Texas	35,000	Stan Lee, Clark Gregg, Chandler Riggs, Scott Wilson, Emily Kinney, IronE Singleton, Lou Diamond Phillips, Esai Morales, George Takei, Nichelle Nichols, Walter Koenig, Robert Englund, Linda Blair, Danny Glover Naomi Grossman, Lori Petty, Julie Newmar, Andrew McCarthy, Martin Kove, William Zabka
September 11–13, 2015	Henry B. Gonzalez Convention Center; San Antonio, Texas	45,000	Stan Lee, Ron Perlman, Robert Rodriguez, Jon Bernthal, Tommy Flanagan, Kim Coates, Ryan Hurst, Mark Boone Junior, Emilio Rivera, Judith Hoag, Ming Na Wen, Kristian Nairn, Manu Bennett
October 28–30, 2016	Henry B. Gonzalez Convention Center; San Antonio, Texas	55,000	Jon Bernthal, David Tennant, Billie Piper, John Barrowman, Charlie Cox, Millie Bobby Brown, Gaten Matarazzo, Caleb McLaughlin, Noah Schnapp, Billy Dee Williams, Elden Henson, Peter Weller, David Mazouz, Camren Bicondova, Cory Michael Smith, Sean Pertwee, Jason David Frank, Amy Jo Johnson, Tom Kenny, Bill Fagerbakke, Rodger Bumpass, Margot Kidder, Dean Cain, Elden Henson, Dennis Rodman, Greg Capullo, Ralph Macchio, Sting, Summer Glau
May 26–28, 2017	Henry B. Gonzalez Convention Center; San Antonio, Texas		Robert Englund, Chris Sarandon
October 26–28, 2018	Alamodome; San Antonio, Texas		Arnold Schwarzenegger, Rick Moranis, Jeff Goldblum, John Barrowman, Sean Gunn, Charles Martinet, Michael Rooker,
November 1–3, 2019	Grand Hyatt; San Antonio, Texas		
