= Coldmirror =

German video and internet performer

Kathrin Fricke
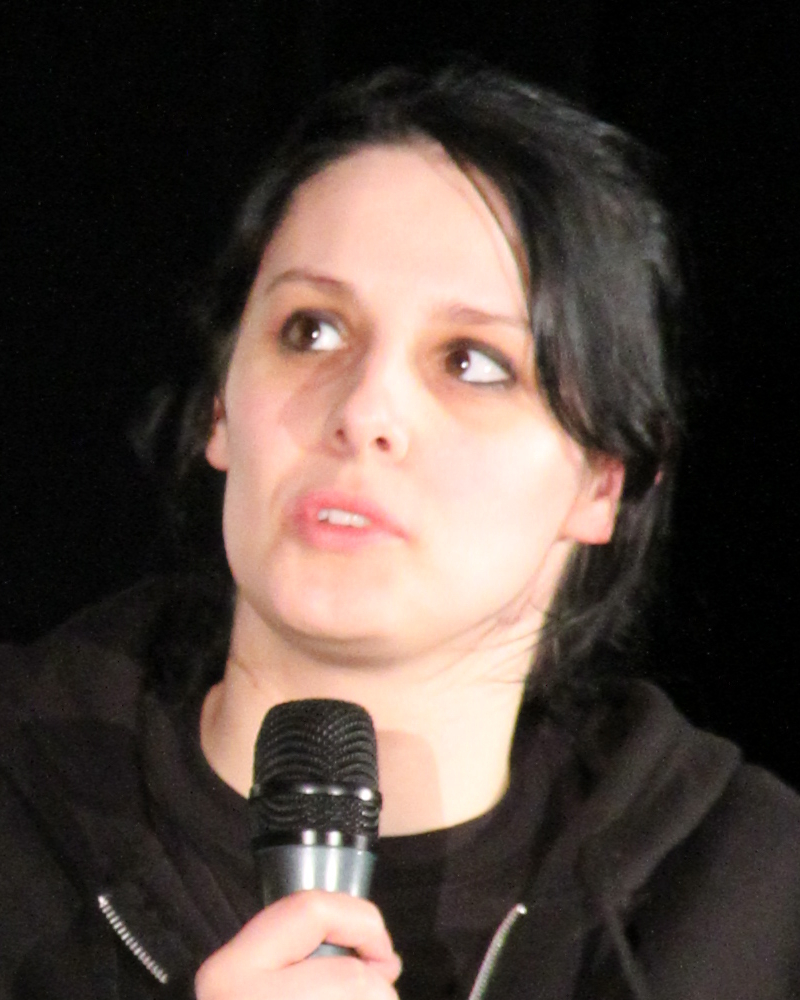
- Kathrin Fricke at the Webvideopreis 2011 in Essen
- Born: October 13, 1984 (age 42); Bremen, West Germany
- Other name: Coldmirror

Comedy career
- Years active: 2006–present
- Medium: Internet, radio, television
- Website: www.youtube.com/user/coldmirror

Kathrin Fricke, better known by her nickname Kaddi or online pseudonym Coldmirror, is a German YouTube creator and comedian. The pseudonym was inspired by the song "Creatures That Kissed in Cold Mirrors" by the band Cradle of Filth. She operates one of the most popular German YouTube channels, moderated radio and television programmes, and publishes blog and vlog entries.

== Early life ==
Fricke was born and raised in Bremen and studied art history and philosophy at the University of Bremen. She finished her bachelor's degree in 2010 with a research paper about the production of video films and a film project about Internet and video game addiction.

According to her own statements, she suffered from strong depression for domestic reasons. In an interview on the YouTube channel "clixoom" she explained that, among other things, the Harry Potter series and the desire to know how it would continue gave her energy and safeguarded her from suicide. However, she stated that this was not necessarily due to the books' exciting plots, but rather simply "having something that you can look forward to."

Kathrin Fricke began early, together with a friend, to record radio dramas, which laid the foundation of her creativity. In 2000 she joined the team of "MixX", a youth television broadcast, as voluntary editor. At this time she compiled her first own websites, where she, for example, published self-drawn pictures with fantasy plots. Her fan fictions with the characters of the Harry Potter series occupied a significant part of her website and stirred attention on the Internet.

== Video performance on YouTube ==
The YouTube channel "Coldmirror" went online on 2 October 2006. The first videos consisted of archive material from Fricke's time as editor for "MixX". After this, Fricke created the videos for the most part alone. Her YouTube channel portrays a continuation of her earlier works in video form.

Starting in fall 2006, Fricke created and released comedic parody dubs of three Harry Potter movies: Harry Potter and the Philosopher's Stone in Harry Potter und ein Stein (i.e. Harry Potter and a Stone), Harry Potter and the Chamber of Secrets in Harry Potter und der geheime Pornokeller (i.e. Harry Potter and the Secret Porn Basement) and Harry Potter and the Goblet of Fire in Harry Potter und der Plastik Pokal (i.e. Harry Potter and the Plastic Cup). In her version, the protagonists make frequent use of taboo topics, foul language and references to Internet and pop culture. Fricke's YouTube account was temporarily deactivated because these parody dubs were considered copyright violations.

Furthermore, she produced multiple music videos and albums portraying Albus Dumbledore as a gangsta rapper, called "Fresh D".

In December 2015, she launched a podcast called "5 Minuten Harry Podcast" (5 Minutes Harry Podcast) in which she talks about 5 minutes each of the first Harry Potter movie and explores random facts about what it is seen in the sequences. It soon became one of the most successful podcasts in German. New episodes were posted irregularly on podcast platforms and her YouTube channel and often reached many million views within the first hours of publishing. The project was finished in December 2023, about 8 years after it began, with the 30th podcast episode.

== Radio and television broadcast ==
Since 2010, Fricke has been active as a moderator in radio and television broadcasts. For the youth channel of Hessischer Rundfunk's You FM, she produces the broadcast Der YOU FM Game Check mit Coldmirror, in which she tests video games.

The television channel Einsfestival has broadcast a programme by Kathrin Fricke under the title coldmirror. The 15-minute programme was shown every month on the first Thursday at 8:45 pm.

This broadcast is content-oriented to Fricke's Internet productions. It is available in individual segments such as video game parody or commercial parody, which can be seen in parts on the Internet and are only technically improved for television. Furthermore, the dubs are shown, that originate with ARD's own material. Politician performances are shown in the broadcast, which Fricke puts behind her own text. Fricke's own category of the TV format is the "Netmob Challenge", in which the viewers are given a task (example: eat a piece of bread in less than a minute or spin in a circle for 30 seconds and then approach the camera), of which they send the result in if the task is fulfilled, which is shown in a compilation.

The category of broadcast which is probably most successful is the so-called "Misheard Lyrics", a copy or continuation of the already available YouTube-Trends, by which, during songs, similar-sounding, although incorrect, lyrics are shown, and the whole is titled as "Misheard". One of the most popular original videos is "Nightwish – Wishmaster". A video from this category, in which the song "Git Hadi Git" from the Turkish singer Ismail YK is parodied as "Keks, alter Keks" (English: Cookie, old Cookie), was originally uploaded from a fan on YouTube and received nearly 350.000 views on the day of upload. Through this, the video went into the list of YouTube-Trends and was copied by more users and uploaded into their channels as the video gained more popularity in the YouTube community. It was also shown on the Bülent Ceylan Show on RTL Television on 19 February 2011 and evoked a strong media reaction with contributions and more in the online edition of the Tageszeitung. and on Sat.1. After the positive media response, Fricke was assigned to produce more Misheard Lyrics videos for the FIFA Women's World Cup, which, among other things, were shown in the Sportschau.

Categories of Broadcast:

- Misheard Lyrics
- Game Check
- Commercial
- Netmob
- Synchro (since Season 1 Episode 02)
- Friends (since Season 1 Episode 07)
- Anime (since Season 2 Episode 01)
- What the FAQ?! (since Season 2 Episode 01)
- Kaddi's Cut (since Season 2 Episode 03)

== Awards ==
On 20 February 2011, Fricke was awarded the Grey Young Talent Award (German: Grey-Nachwuchspreis) in the competition for the first German Web Video Award (German: Deutscher Webvideopreis). She also was nominated in the category "Personality", which was won by Holger Kreymeier. In the context of the event, Fricke was also a guest in an episode of Kreymeier's Fernsehkritik-TV.

On 16 August 2011, YOU FM was nominated with Kathrin Fricke for the German Radio Prize (German: Deutscher Radio Preis) 2011 in the category "Best Innovation".

In January 2012, the European Web Video Academy announced that Fricke would be a jury member of the 2nd Webvideopreis.

== Discography ==
=== Albums ===
- 2005: Stay Fresh, Stay Dumb!
- 2006: Underground
- 2007: Dumbledore's Army
- 2007: Großmutterficker
- 2007: Audiovergewaltigung
- 2008: Post für mich
- 2008: Tubal Uriah Butler
- 2011: Dumblecore

=== Singles and Videoclips ===
- 2006: Back from The Underground
- 2006: Geddo im Zoo
- 2007: Wenn du denkst
- 2007: Fresh D. vs. MCV
- 2008: Fresh D vs. MC V im TS
- 2008: Xtreme Dumbledore
- 2009: Tromaggot
- 2009: Im Altenheim
- 2009: Ho Ho Ho …
- 2012: Workstatt
- 2013: Musikvideo
- 2013: Die Alten
- 2013: FreshDs fedder Beat
- 2014: Sit’n’Dance
- 2014: Großmutterficker (Naughty Neuinterpretation)
- 2016: Frisch ausm Rhymebook

=== as feature Artist ===
- 2010: Stamm Rein & Ode to Jam II on The River Of Ezar by Aequitas
