= Puerto Rico Comic Con =

Puerto Rico Comic Con (stylized as Puerto Rico ComicCon), also informally known as PRCOMICCON, is a three-day fan convention and entertainment event held since 2002 in San Juan, Puerto Rico. Usually taking place in the Puerto Rico Convention Center, this is the biggest event of its kind in the Caribbean today with more than 42,000 people visiting, having grown from its first iteration, which took place at the local YMCA venue of Hato Rey and had an attendance of about 1,000 visitors.

== Event history ==
The Puerto Rico Comic Con was first launched as the Caribbean Sci-Fi Expo, a modest comic book convention and science fiction festival in 2002 with about 1,000 visitors. The event was celebrated annually at the same YMCA Hato Rey venue from 2002 until 2007 when it was rebranded as the Puerto Rico Comic Con, following the fan convention trends across the United States. This same year the event venue was moved to the bigger Puerto Rico Convention Center, the biggest and most modern of its kind in the island, in order to accommodate and cater for the larger amount of vendors and visitors. The 2014 event broke the 30,000 visitor mark; this same year was the first to invite celebrities such as actors Michael Rooker and Jason David Fran, and writer Scott Snyder. Subsequent invitees have included comic book creators such as John Romita Jr., and media celebrities such as Kevin Smith, Jason Momoa and Elijah Wood. The event's 15th anniversary on 2017 received between 40,000 and 42,000 visitors, making it the largest in the Caribbean and Central America. Puerto Rico Comic Con today draws about 40,000 attendees each year with more than 300 visiting vendors and exhibitors from Puerto Rico, the United States, Canada, Latin America and Germany. The event is also very popular in the local cosplay community with at least 50% of visitors attending dressed up in costume during the 2025 event.
