= Ai-Kon =

Manitoban anime convention

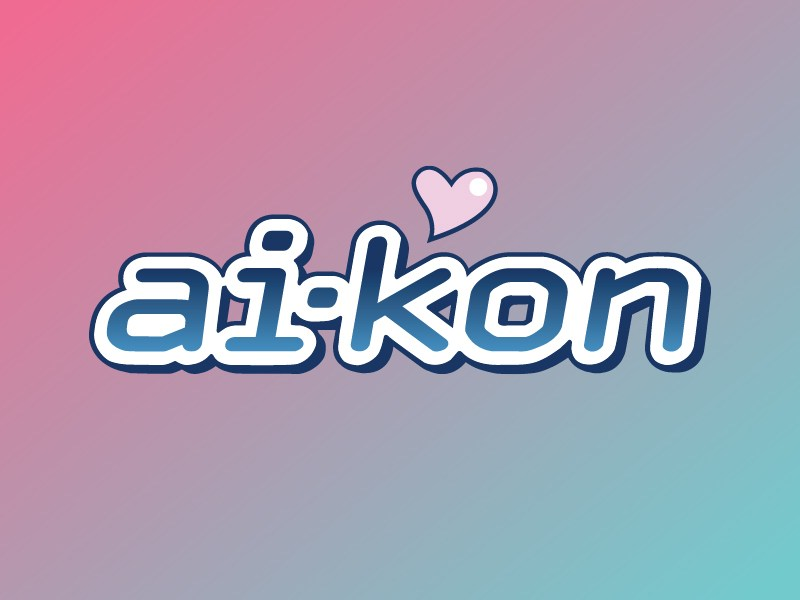
- Ai-Kon logo For The Love Of Anime!
- Status: Active
- Venue: RBC Convention Centre Winnipeg
- Locations: Winnipeg, Manitoba
- Country: Canada
- Inaugurated: 2001
- Attendance: 10,633 in 2024
- Filing status: Non-profit
- Website: ai-kon.org

Ai-Kon is an annual three-day anime convention held on a weekend during the month of July in Winnipeg, Manitoba, Canada. Ai-Kon was first held at the University of Manitoba in 2001 and is currently held at the RBC Convention Centre. The convention's name is a blend of the words ai (Japanese for love) and convention and is derived from its slogan "For the love of anime". The word ai was also chosen to play on the fact that the club had a magazine they called Anime Injection.

== Programming ==
Ai-Kon provides a wide variety of on mandate programming put on by committee staff, members of the community, guests and industry partners. Streaming/showing rooms run 24-hours during the conventions featuring titles in both Japanese and English languages. Alongside anime, the convention also hosts many video game and Japanese culture related activities.

Additional convention events include:

- Marketplace: Dealer's Room and an Artists Alley
- Cosplay events: Cosplay Contest, Cosplay Skills Faire, workshops
- Gamer's Lounge: no entry tournaments, various video games stations, tabletop gaming area, charity event for Extra Life
- Music: Saturday Dance, Dance Showcase
- Panels and workshops: Guests, staff, cultural workshops, fan based/ members of the community, industry, game shows, fashion shows
- Other attractions: Cultural room, Maid Cafe, Gundam Builders World Cup National qualifiers, Tamiya mini 4awd stock car tournament, pop-up partnered experiences, art auction

== History ==
Ai-Kon was first held in July 2001 at the University of Manitoba in Winnipeg, Manitoba, and was run by the University of Manitoba Anime Club (UMAnime). The founding members were the club's executive staff, Kristjanna Thorarinson, Riki Lecotey, Kwan Fu Sit, Tong Lin, Cathleen Ma, Tim Groner, Geoff Wright, and Jeff Agapito. At the time the club held one-day events but they had so many things planned that summer, the club decided on making it a two-day event but added a dance on Friday evenings, making it a 3-day convention. In 2002 the event went on hiatus for one year, due to changes within the club, and in July 2003 a second Ai-Kon was held at the university.

Today, Ai-Kon is a non-profit organization that is run by a volunteer committee. It continues to be held annually in Winnipeg each summer.

In 2011, as a celebration of the 10 year anniversary, Ai-Kon held a one-day event in January called "The Ai-Kon Winter Festival". This one-day event is now held annually in February under the name "Winterfest".

=== Event history ===
Dates	Location	Attendance	Guests
July 20–22, 2001	University of Manitoba; Winnipeg, Manitoba	500	Richard Kekuhuna (DVD Producer for Bandai entertainment)
July 25–27, 2003	University of Manitoba; Winnipeg, Manitoba	700	
July 30 – August 1, 2004	Sheraton Hotel; Winnipeg, Manitoba	1,000	
August 12–14, 2005	Winnipeg Convention Centre; Winnipeg, Manitoba	960	
July 21–23, 2006	Winnipeg Convention Centre; Winnipeg, Manitoba	1,100	
July 27–29, 2007	Winnipeg Convention Centre; Winnipeg, Manitoba	1,551	Greg Ayres and Vic Mignogna
July 25–27, 2008	Winnipeg Convention Centre; Winnipeg, Manitoba	1,825	Chris Ayres, Greg Ayres, and Johnny Yong Bosch.
July 24–26, 2009	Winnipeg Convention Centre; Winnipeg, Manitoba	2,180	Caitlin Glass, Tiffany Grant, and Jan Scott-Frazier.
July 16–18, 2010	Winnipeg Convention Centre; Winnipeg, Manitoba	2,365	Greg Ayres, Monica Rial, Kirby Morrow, Christopher Ayres
January 15, 2011 (Winter Festival)	Winnipeg Convention Centre; Winnipeg, Manitoba	623	
July 15–17, 2011	Winnipeg Convention Centre; Winnipeg, Manitoba	2,575	Greg Ayres, Eric Vale, Christopher Sabat, Johnny Yong Bosch
July 20–22, 2012	Winnipeg Convention Centre; Winnipeg, Manitoba	2,785	Christopher Sabat, Monica Rial, Brina Palencia, Todd Haberkorn, Greg Ayres
January 12, 2013 (Winterfest)	Winnipeg Convention Centre; Winnipeg, Manitoba		
July 12–14, 2013	Winnipeg Convention Centre; Winnipeg, Manitoba	3,148	Chris Patton, Sarah Sullivan (Representative from Funimation), J. Michael Tatum, Greg Ayres
February 8, 2014 (Winterfest)	Winnipeg Convention Centre; Winnipeg, Manitoba		
July 11–13, 2014	Winnipeg Convention Centre; Winnipeg, Manitoba	3,194	Christopher Sabat, Richard Ian Cox, Greg Ayres, Johnny N Junkers (Cosplay Guest), The 404s
February 28, 2015 (Winterfest)	Delta Winnipeg Hotel; Winnipeg, Manitoba		
July 17–19, 2015	RBC Convention Centre Winnipeg (Re-named); Winnipeg, Manitoba	3,636	The 404s, Greg Ayres, Eric Vale, Vickybunnyangel, Terri Hawkes, Ian Sinclair
February 27, 2016 (Winterfest)	RBC Convention Centre Winnipeg; Winnipeg, Manitoba		
July 15–17, 2016	RBC Convention Centre Winnipeg; Winnipeg, Manitoba	4,067	Bryce Papenbrook, Cherami Leigh, Greg Ayres, Josh Grelle, Sonny Strait, Yume & Kitsuri Cosplay, The 404s
February 25, 2017 (Winterfest)	RBC Convention Centre Winnipeg; Winnipeg, Manitoba		The 404s
July 21–23, 2017	RBC Convention Centre Winnipeg; Winnipeg, Manitoba	3,973	Arda Wigs Canada, The 404s, Greg Ayres, Mike McFarland, Nathan DeLuca, Shushuwafflez, Christine Cabanos, Cristina Valenzuela, Colleen Clinkenbeard, Joshua Seth
February 24, 2018 (Winterfest)	RBC Convention Centre Winnipeg; Winnipeg, Manitoba	1,951	Japanese Cultural Association of Manitoba, The Escape Hatch, Nintendo, Video Games Live
July 27–29, 2018	RBC Convention Centre Winnipeg; Winnipeg, Manitoba	5,170	KujaOnii & Lady Zero Cosplay, The 404s, Greg Ayres, Ray Chase, Max Mittelman, Josh Grelle, Robbie Daymond, Japanese Cultural Association of Manitoba, Extra Life
February 23, 2019 (Winterfest)	RBC Convention Centre Winnipeg; Winnipeg, Manitoba	2,260	Seishun Youth Academy
July 26–28, 2019	RBC Convention Centre Winnipeg; Winnipeg, Manitoba	5,906	Micah Solusod, The 404s, Greg Ayres, Luci Christian, Monica Rial, Sarcasm-hime, Crunchyroll, Scott "KaiserNeko" Frerichs, Curtis "Takahata101" Arnott, Anthony "Antfish" Sardinha, Nick "Lanipator" Landis, Jerry Jewell, Japanese Cultural Association of Manitoba,
February 22, 2020 (Winterfest)	RBC Convention Centre Winnipeg; Winnipeg, Manitoba	2,297	
July 24-26, 2020 (Ai-Kon Online)	Virtual		The 404s, Crunchyroll
February 27, 2021 (Winterfest Online)	Virtual		Greg Ayres, Mike McFarland, The 404s, Crunchyroll
July 22-24, 2022	RBC Convention Centre; Winnipeg, Manitoba	8,428	Greg Ayres, Kaiji Tang, The 404s, Rock M Sakura, Veronica Taylor, Terri Hawkes, Bryson Baugus, Crunchyroll
July 14-16, 2023	RBC Convention Centre; Winnipeg, Manitoba	10,533	Greg Ayres, Lucien Dodge, Erica Mendez, Zeno Robinson, Mike McFarland, A.K. WIRRU, Ben Diskin, Ryan Colt Levy
July 12-14, 2024	RBC Convention Centre; Winnipeg, Manitoba	10,633	Greg Ayres, Bryce Papenbrook, Zach Aguilar, Trina Nishimura, Lex Lang, Kitsurie, Alexandre is Fluffy, The 404s
July 11-13, 2025	RBC Convention Centre; Winnipeg, Manitoba	11,507	Greg Ayres, Brianna Knickerbocker, Damien Haas, Gaby Cosplay, Twinfools, Griffin Burns, Jonah Scott, Mallorie Rodak, Ocean in Space, SungWon Cho, The 404s

== Mascot ==
Aiko is a fictional cheerful, stylish, energetic anime girl with pink hair and blue eyes. Her various incarnations coordinate with the convention's yearly theme. The mascot is selected annually from an open contest. Aiko's many manifestations are used on convention promotional materials, clothing, badges, and other wearables. Doug is Aiko's fictional younger brother and likewise the Winterfest mascot. He is portrayed as younger, mischievous and playful with white hair and blue eyes.

== Other sources ==
- "Anime lovers flock to downtown Winnipeg for annual convention". CBC News. July 29, 2018.
- "Interview - Manitoba's largest anime convention is back this summer". Global News. July 12, 2018.
- "SLV's three things to do for the weekend of July 27". Global News. July 27, 2018.
- "Winnipeg anime convention returns after two-year hiatus, breaks attendance records". CBC News. July 24, 2022.
