= Cairo Comix Con =

Annual comic book convention

Cairo Comix Con (also known as Cairo Comix Festival) is an annual comic book convention held in Cairo, Egypt which was established in 2015 by Shennawy, Magdy Lshafee, and the duo brother Mohamed and Haitham Elseht a.k.a. Twins Cartoon. A number of prizes are awarded at the festival, including Best Published Graphic Novel in Arabic, Best Digital Comic, Best Comics Magazine, and Best Comic Strip.
