= Anthem (disambiguation) =

An anthem is a type of church music or a song of celebration. It may also refer to:

Anthem may also refer to:

== Music ==
=== Albums ===
- Anthem, an eponymous 1985 album by Japanese heavy metal band Anthem (band)
- Anthem (Black Uhuru album), 1984
- Anthem (Flogging Molly album), 2022
- Anthem (Goodness album), 1998
- Anthem (Hanson album), 2013
- Anthem (Steve Lacy album), 1990
- Anthem (Less Than Jake album), 2003
- Anthem (Christian Scott album), 2007
- Anthem (Ralph Towner album), 2000
- Anthem (Toyah album)
- Anthems (Anthrax EP), 2013
- Anthems (Kerry Ellis album), 2010
- Anthems (Laibach album)
- Anthems (Messengers EP), 2010
- Anthems (Pure Love album), 2013
- Anthems (John Williamson album), 2000
- Anthems (Bugoy Drilon album), 2026

=== Songs ===
- "Anthem" (Chess song), the closing song from Act I of the musical Chess, 1984
- "Anthem" (The Clouds song), 1992
- "Anthem" (N-Joi song), 1990
- "Anthem" (Vangelis song), the 2002 FIFA World Cup official anthem
- "Anthem (We Are the Fire)", by Trivium, 2006
- "Anthem" (The Wildhearts song), 1997
- "The Anthem" (Good Charlotte song), 2003
- "The Anthem" (Pitbull song), 2008
- "The Anthem" (Planetshakers song), 2012
- "Anthem", by Blink-182 from the album Enema of the State
  - "Anthem Part Two", by Blink-182 from the album Take Off Your Pants and Jacket
  - "Anthem Part 3", by Blink-182 from One More Time
- "Anthem", by Brett Kissel from the album We Were That Song
- "Anthem", by Bring Me the Horizon from the album There Is a Hell Believe Me I've Seen It. There Is a Heaven Let's Keep It a Secret.
- "Anthem", by Deep Purple from the album The Book of Taliesyn
- "Anthem", by Doug Wimbish from the album Trippy Notes for Bass & Remixes
- "Anthem", by Filo & Peri featuring Eric Lumiere
- "Anthem", by Godflesh from Hymns
- "Anthem", by Iced Earth from Dystopia
- "Anthem", by King Tuff from King Tuff
- "Anthem", by Leonard Cohen from the album The Future
- "Anthem", by Moby from the album Everything Is Wrong
- "Anthem", by Phantom Planet from the album The Guest
- "Anthem", by Ringo Starr from the album Ringo 2012
- "Anthem", by Rush from the album Fly by Night
- "Anthem", by Your Memorial from the album Redirect
- "Anthem", by Zebrahead from the album Broadcast to the World

== Places ==
- Anthem, Arizona, US
- Anthem, Nevada, US
- Anthem, West Virginia, US

== Other ==
- Anthem (comics), a fictional superhero in the Marvel comics universe
- Anthem (film), a 1991 music video
- Anthem (novella), a 1938 novella by Ayn Rand
- Anthem (video game), 2019 video game developed by BioWare and published by Electronic Arts
- Anthem Inc., the former name of Elevance Health, an American health insurance provider
- Anthem Records, a Canadian record label
- Anthem Sports & Entertainment, a Canadian broadcasting company
- Anthem trance, also known as uplifting trance, a genre of trance music
- MS Anthem of the Seas, a Quantum-class cruise ship owned by Royal Caribbean International
- Mack Anthem, an American truck manufactured by Mack Trucks since 2018
- Blue Cross Blue Shield Association, an American healthcare corporation and industry

== See also ==
- The Anthem (disambiguation)
- National Anthem (disambiguation)
