= Op. 79 =

In music, Op. 79 stands for Opus number 79. Compositions that are assigned this number include:

- Beethoven – Piano Sonata No. 25
- Brahms – Rhapsodies, Op. 79
- Britten – The Building of the House
- Elgar – Le drapeau belge
- Fauré – Fantaisie
- Milhaud – Little Symphony No. 6
- Saint-Saëns – Caprice sur des airs danois et russes
- Schumann – Liederalbum für die Jugend
- Shostakovich – From Jewish Folk Poetry
- Strauss – Arabella
- Weber – Konzertstück in F minor
