= National Anthem (disambiguation) =

A national anthem is a country's national song.

National Anthem or The National Anthem may also refer to:

== Film and television ==
- "The National Anthem" (Black Mirror), an episode of the television series Black Mirror
- The National Anthem (film), a 1999 account of the composition of the Chinese national anthem
- National Anthem (2003 film), a Japanese horror film
- National Anthem (2023 film), an American drama film

== Music ==
- National Anthem (album), a 2005 album by The Away Team
- "National Anthem" (Lana Del Rey song), 2012
- "National Anthem", a 2012 song by The Gaslight Anthem from Handwritten
- "The National Anthem" (Benjamin Britten), a 1962 version of "God Save the Queen"
- "The National Anthem" (Radiohead song), 2000
- "National Anthem", a 2018 song by Todrick Hall from Forbidden

== See also ==
- Anthem (disambiguation)
- National Flag Anthem (disambiguation), anthems played when hoisting nations' flags
- "National Anthem Part 2!", a 2015 song by the USA Freedom Kids
- Nemzeti dal ("National Song"), a 1848 poem written by Sándor Petőfi
