= Quantum of the Seas =

Quantum-class Cruise Ship

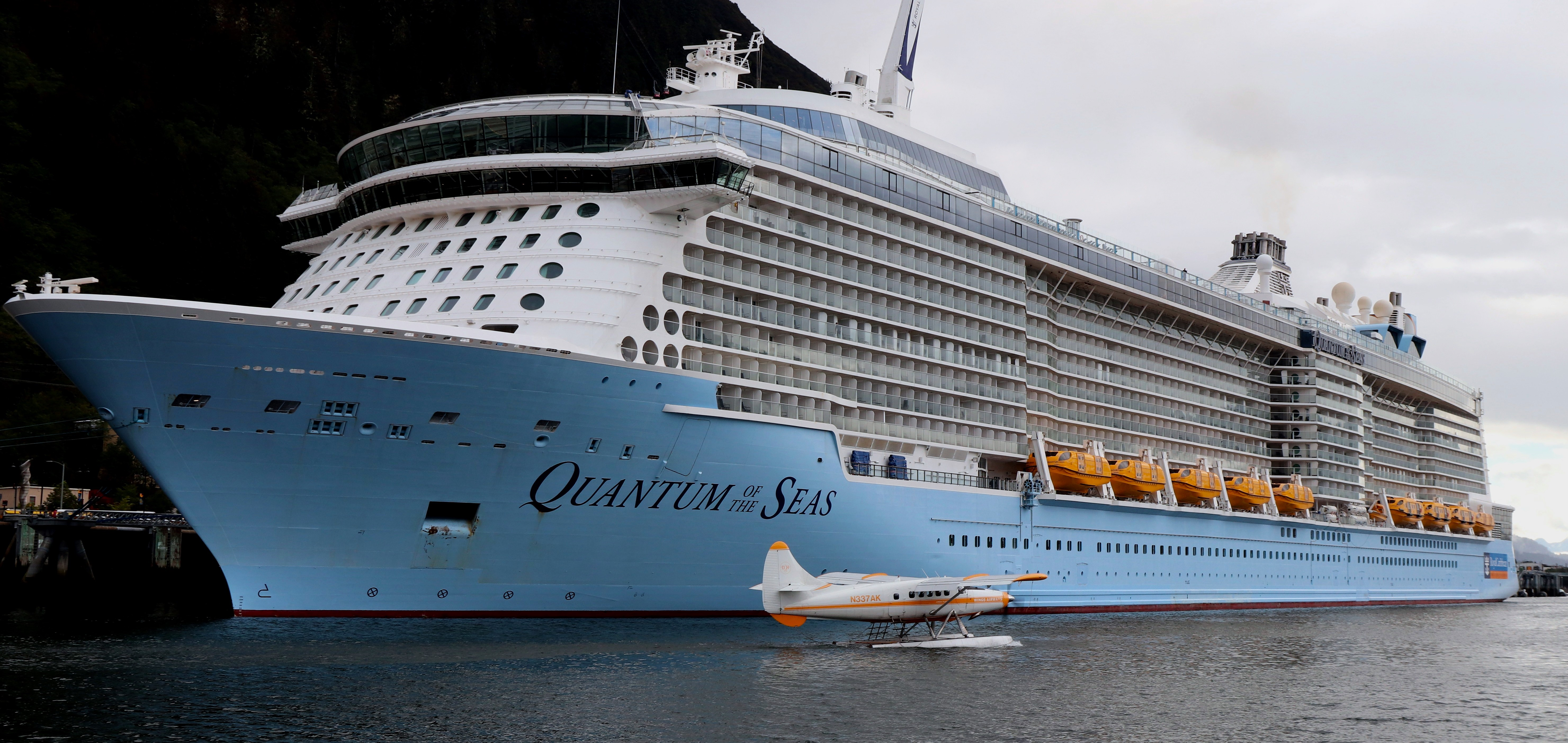
- Quantum of the Seas in Juneau, Alaska on 16 September 2022

History

Bahamas
- Name: Quantum of the Seas
- Owner: Quantum of the Seas Inc.
- Operator: Royal Caribbean International
- Port of registry: Nassau, Bahamas
- Ordered: 11 February 2011
- Builder: Meyer Werft, Papenburg, Germany
- Cost: US$935 million
- Yard number: S. 697
- Laid down: 2 August 2013
- Launched: 13 August 2014 (float-out)
- Christened: 30 October 2014
- Completed: 28 October 2014
- Maiden voyage: 2 November 2014
- In service: 2014–present
- Identification: Call sign: C6BH8; IMO number: 9549463; MMSI number: 311000267
- Status: In Service

General characteristics
- Class & type: Quantum-class cruise ship
- Tonnage: 168,666 GT
- Length: 347.7 m (1,141 ft)
- Beam: 49.47 m (162 ft) (max); 41.4 m (136 ft) (waterline)
- Height: 72 m (236 ft 3 in)
- Draught: 8.8 m (29 ft)
- Decks: 16 (14 passenger-accessible)
- Installed power: 2 × Wärtsilä 12V46F (2 × 14,400 kW); 2 × Wärtsilä 16V46F (2 × 19,200 kW); 2 × Cat 3516C HD (2 × 2,500 kW)
- Propulsion: Diesel-electric; 2 × ABB Azipod XO thrusters (2 × 20.5 MW); 4 × 3,500 kW (4,694 hp) Brunvoll FU115 bow thrusters
- Speed: 22.0 knots (40.7 km/h; 25.3 mph)
- Capacity: 4,180 passengers (double occupancy); 4,905 passengers (maximum occupancy); 1,500 Crew

Quantum of the Seas is a Quantum-class cruise ship currently operated by Royal Caribbean International. At her time of delivery in 2014, Quantum of the Seas was the third largest cruise ship in the world by gross tonnage. The lead ship of her class, she has served the Alaskan and Australian cruise markets and began servicing the Mexican market out of Los Angeles as of November 2025.

== History ==
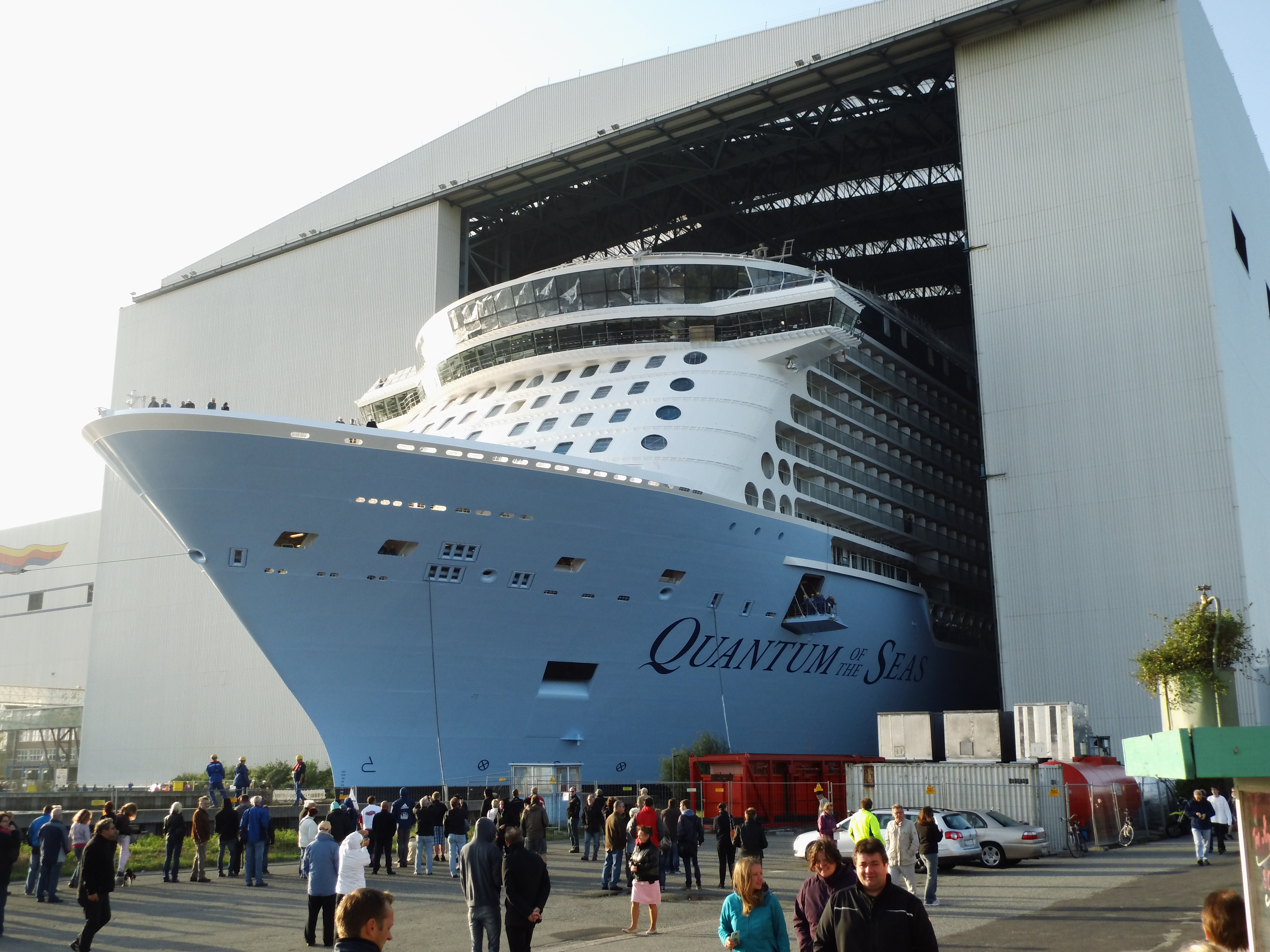
13 August 2014 - Launch of Quantum of the Seas at Meyer Werft in Papenburg

=== Planning and construction ===
On 11 February 2011, Royal Caribbean announced that it had ordered the first of a new class of ships from the Meyer Werft shipyard in Papenburg, Germany, scheduled to be delivered by Fall 2014. At the time, the project was code-named "Project Sunshine". Later that year, two 20.5-megawatt ABB Azipod XO propulsion units were ordered for the ship.

Meyer Werft performed the steel cutting for the ship on 31 January 2013, the same day it was announced that the new ship would be named Quantum of the Seas, making her the lead vessel of the Quantum class.

Quantum of the Seas had her keel laid down on 2 August 2013. She was floated out from the shipyard on 9 August 2014. Her River Ems conveyance began on 21 September 2014 and her sea trials began three days later, on 24 September.

There is the Bionic Bar which features robotic bartenders from Makr Shakr.

=== Delivery and christening ===
Quantum of the Seas was delivered to Royal Caribbean on 28 October 2014, at a cost of US$935 million. The ship was christened by Kristin Chenoweth on 14 November 2014 at Cape Liberty Cruise Port in Bayonne, New Jersey, U.S.

=== Service history ===
Quantum of the Seas spent her inaugural 2014–2015 season sailing from Cape Liberty on 7-to-12-night itineraries to the Caribbean and Bahamas before she was re-deployed to China. She embarked on her 53-day eastward re-positioning cruise from Cape Liberty to Shanghai in May 2015. In June 2015, the ship commenced operating cruises from Shanghai on 3-to-8-night itineraries to Japan and South Korea year-round until moving to Tianjin upon the arrival of Spectrum of the Seas in Shanghai in mid-2019. Beginning in November 2019, Quantum of the Seas was scheduled to operate seasonally in Southeast Asia from Singapore for six months each year until 2024 and rotate between homeporting in Tianjin and Singapore year-round. However, in March 2020, Royal Caribbean announced a re-deployment of Quantum of the Seas to Alaska for summer 2021, sailing week-long itineraries from Seattle, marking her debut in the Western United States.

In 2020, due to the worldwide COVID-19 pandemic, sailings were suspended, on various dates in the various regions, by all cruise lines. As of 12 January 2021, a report indicated that all Royal Caribbean sailings had been suspended until 30 April, except for Quantum of the Seas. This vessel had resumed sailing in Singapore in December 2020, "with the local government's CruiseSafe Certification ... [that meets] the comprehensive health and safety requirements developed by the Singapore government".

Through 2022, 2023, and 2024 the Quantum alternates between Alaska (based in Seattle) and Australia (based in Brisbane). Australian cruises include South Pacific, New Zealand, and North Queensland itineraries with some shorter cruises between Brisbane and Sydney.

On April 26, 2023, an Australian man fell from the ship when it was in the Pacific Ocean, 1400km south of Hawaii. The US Coast Guard searched for hours but eventually called off the rescue mission.
