= Freedom class =

Freedom class may refer to:

- Freedom-class cruise ship, a series of cruise ships operated by Royal Caribbean International
- Freedom-class littoral combat ship, a series of United States Navy littoral combat ships
