= The National Anthem (Benjamin Britten) =

"The National Anthem, arr. Benjamin Britten"

Single by London Symphony Orchestra
- Recorded: 1962
- Genre: Classical music
- Label: Decca
- Songwriter: Henry Carey

The National Anthem is a 1962 choral and orchestral arrangement of God Save the Queen by Benjamin Britten. The arrangement was written for the Leeds Festival. It has been described as an "extraordinary progression from pianissimo prayer to pealing, overlapping choral fortissimo".

== Instrumentation ==
Britten arranged the anthem for an SATB chorus and an orchestra consisting of two flutes, two oboes, two clarinets in B-flat, two bassoons; four horns in F, two trumpets in C, three trombones, one tuba; a percussion section that includes timpani, cymbals, side drum, bass drum; and strings.

== Notable performances ==
In 1965 this Version of the National Anthem was used for the Closing of the Royal Christmas message.

The piece was performed by Britten and the English Chamber Orchestra, along with the overture The Building of the House, at the openings of two English concert halls in 1967.

=== The Queen Elizabeth Hall ===
The Queen Elizabeth Hall (QEH) is a purpose-built music venue on the South Bank in London which opened in March 1967. Britten prepared a reduced orchestration of his arrangement for the ECO to play at the opening concert.

=== Snape Maltings ===
Snape Maltings is a converted industrial building in Suffolk. The Queen presided over its opening as a concert hall in June 1967 and its reopening after fire in 1970.

=== Royal Albert Hall ===
Beginning in 2010, it has been played each year at the close of the Last Night of the Proms. In 2022, the event was cancelled due to the death of Queen Elizabeth II a few days earlier. In 2023, the arrangement was sung for the first time as God Save the King in honour of King Charles III.

== Release of recording ==
The arrangement was released by Decca both as a single (45-71146) and as 45 EP (SEC 5119) 1962. On the B side of the single was the Trumpet Voluntary in Sir Henry Wood's arrangement with the London Symphony Orchestra augmented by the trumpeters of Kneller Hall in a performance conducted by Kenneth Alwyn. The tracks of the EP were:

- Track A1: Benjamin Britten, L.S.O. And Chorus - The National Anthem, Arranger Britten,
- Track A2: "Air" of Bach's Orchestral Suite No.3 in D Major, Sir Adrian Boult, with the Orchestra of the Royal Opera House, Covent Garden
- B1 Granville Bantock's arrangement of Sheep may safely graze from Bach's Cantata Was mir behagt, ist nur die muntre Jagd, BWV 208.
- B2 "Purcell's" Trumpet Voluntary (now known to be by Clarke) LSO conducted by Kenneth Alwyn.
