= Royal Caribbean International =

Norwegian–American cruise line

- Logo used since 2024

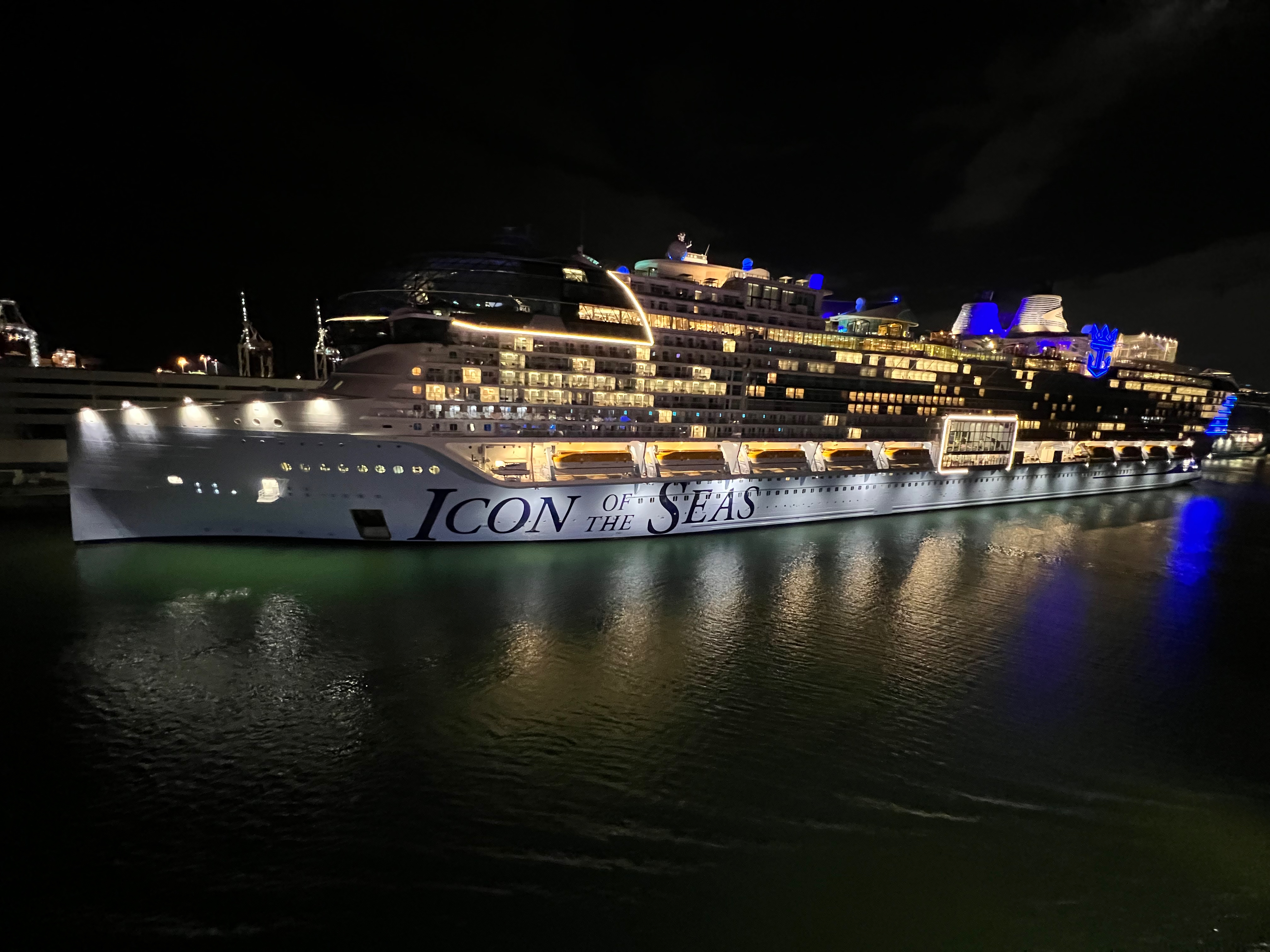
- Royal Caribbean's Icon of the Seas in Miami, Florida
- Formerly: Royal Caribbean Cruise Line (1968–1997)
- Type: Subsidiary
- Industry: Tourism
- Founded: 1969; 57 years ago in Norway.
- Headquarters: 25.7752°N 80.1784°W, Miami, Florida, United States
- Areas served: Worldwide
- Key people: Michael Bayley (President & CEO)
- Services: Cruises
- Parent: Royal Caribbean Group
- Website: www.royalcaribbean.com

Royal Caribbean International (RCI), formerly Royal Caribbean Cruise Line (RCCL), is a cruise line founded in 1969 in Norway and organized as a wholly owned subsidiary of Royal Caribbean Group since 1997.

Based in Miami, Florida, it is the largest cruise line by revenue and second largest by passenger counts. As of 2025, Royal Caribbean International controlled 27.0% of the worldwide cruise market by passengers and 24.8% by revenue.

As of August 2025, the line operated 29 ships, with additional vessels on order.

== History ==
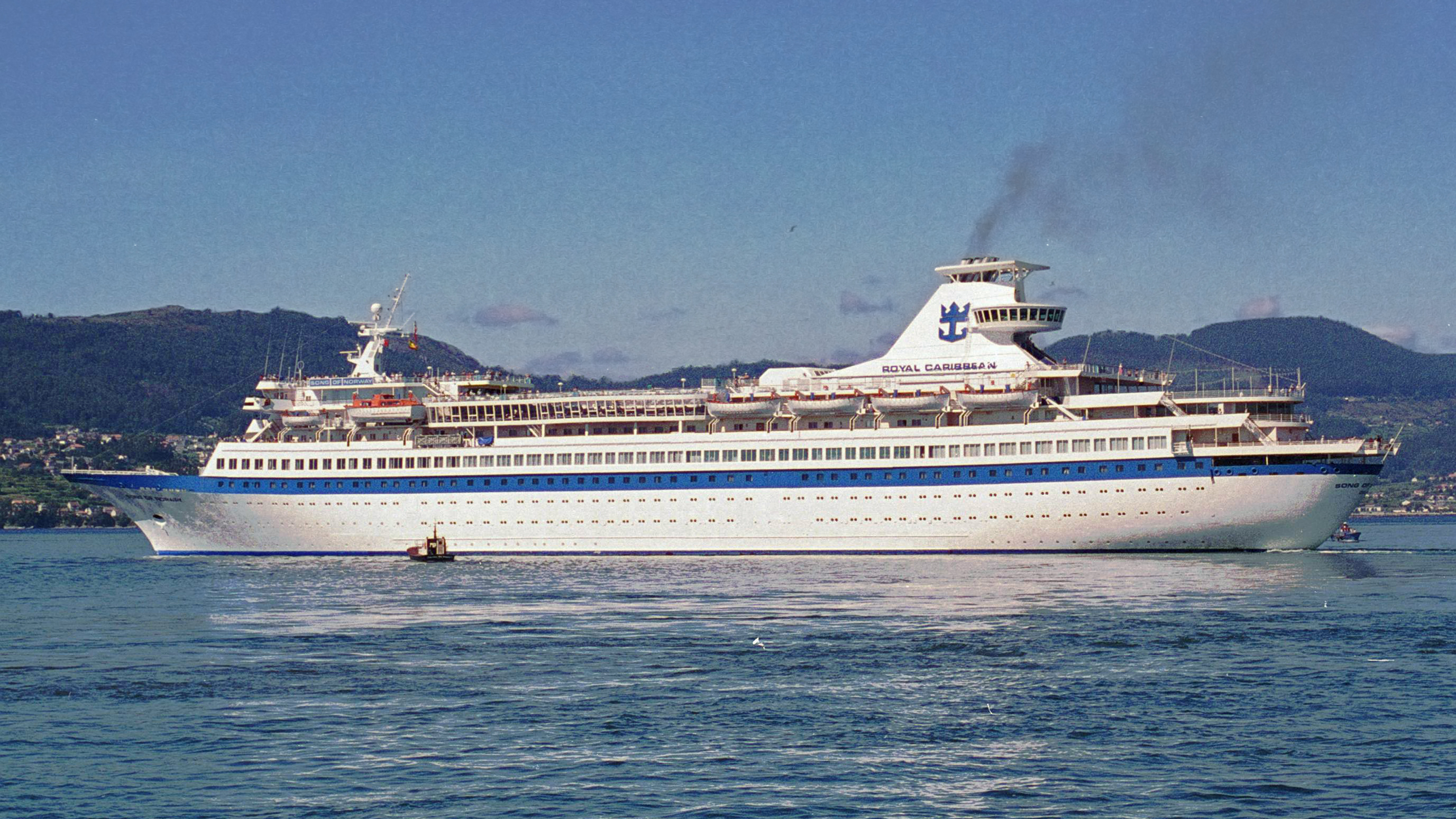
Royal Caribbean's first ship, Song of Norway

Royal Caribbean Cruise Line was founded in 1968 by three Norwegian shipping companies: Anders Wilhelmsen & Company, I.M. Skaugen & Company, and Gotaas Larsen. The newly created line put its first ship, Song of Norway, into service two years later. A year later, the line added Nordic Prince to the fleet and in 1972 it added Sun Viking. In 1978, Song of Norway became Royal Caribbean's first passenger ship to be lengthened. This was accomplished by inserting an 85-foot (26 m) section. Following the success of this work, Nordic Prince was also stretched in 1980. During the stretching of both ships, their sterns were modified to create more open space. In 1982, Royal Caribbean launched Song of America.

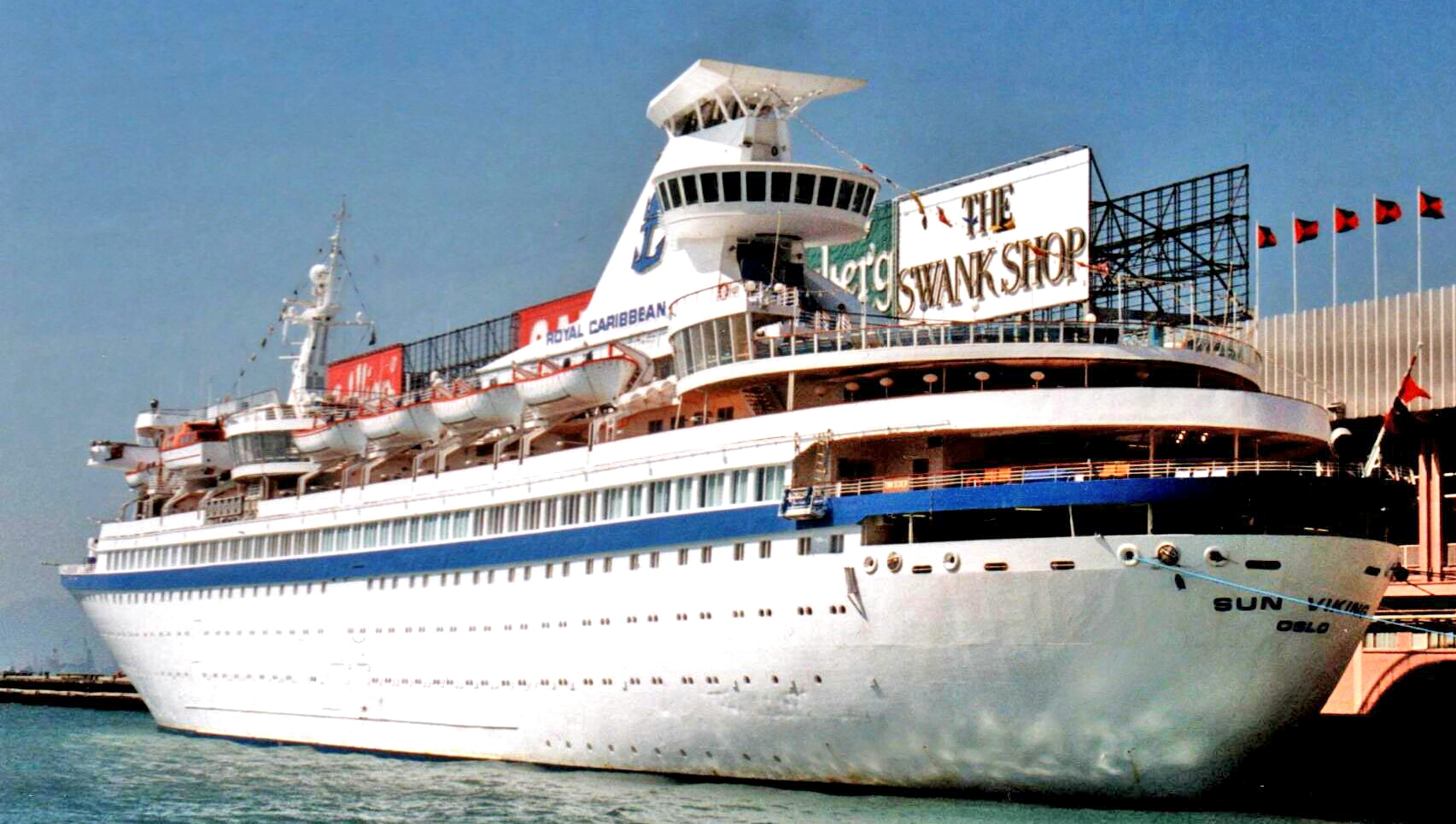
Royal Caribbean's third ship, Sun Viking

In 1986, Royal Caribbean leased a coastal property in Labadie, Haiti, to be used as a private destination for its guests, renamed as Labadee. After a corporate restructuring in 1988, the line launched Sovereign of the Seas, the largest passenger vessel afloat at the time. That same year, Royal Caribbean also merged with Admiral Cruises. Two years later in 1990, Nordic Empress and Viking Serenade entered service and Royal Caribbean purchased a second private destination, Little Stirrup Cay, an island in the Bahamas, which they branded as CocoCay.

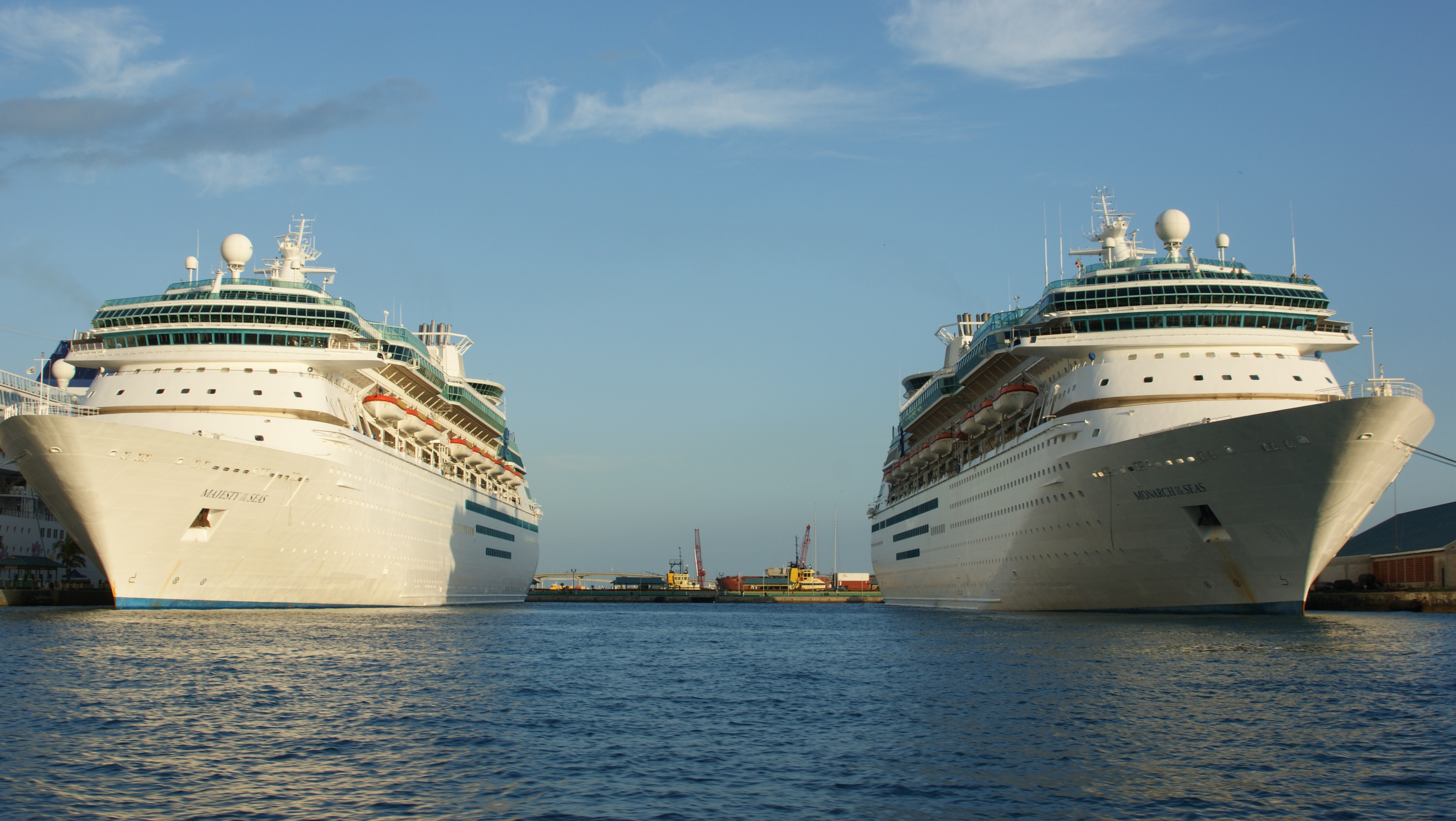
Majesty of the Seas and Monarch of the Seas in Nassau, Bahamas

The second and third Sovereign-class cruise ships Monarch of the Seas and Majesty of the Seas were delivered in 1991 and 1992 respectively.

Royal Caribbean went public on the New York Stock Exchange in 1993.

=== Reorganization and renaming ===
In 1997, it merged with the Greek cruise line Celebrity Cruises and changed its name from Royal Caribbean Cruise Line to Royal Caribbean International. At the same time, Royal Caribbean Group was formed as Royal Caribbean Cruises Ltd. to serve as a holding company that owned both Celebrity Cruises and Royal Caribbean International.

In 2000, Royal Caribbean operated a series of land-and-sea-based "cruise tours" in Alaska, featuring glass-domed train cars to scenic destinations within the state and Canada. Over the next two years, they also introduced cruise tours to destinations throughout Europe.

The larger Oasis class, featuring Oasis of the Seas and Allure of the Seas, launched in 2009 and 2010. In December 2012, Royal Caribbean announced that they had ordered a third Oasis-class cruise ship from STX France, which would be larger than the previous ships in the class. In March 2014, Royal Caribbean announced that they had ordered a fourth Oasis-Class ship from STX France.

In February 2013, Royal Caribbean announced the first two ships of their newest Quantum class, Quantum of the Seas and Anthem of the Seas, which were being built at the Meyer Werft shipyard. In May of that year, Royal Caribbean announced that they had signed a contract for a third Quantum-class ship for delivery in mid-2016.

In September 2014, Royal Caribbean announced that the third Quantum-class ship would be named Ovation of the Seas, and in February 2015 they announced that the third Oasis-class ship would be named Harmony of the Seas.

In March 2015, Royal Caribbean announced that they had agreed to sell Splendour of the Seas to TUI Cruises in the second quarter of 2016.

In June 2016, Royal Caribbean announced that they had agreed to sell Legend of the Seas to TUI Cruises in the second quarter of 2017.

The company lobbies in various jurisdictions in which it operates. In the United States of America, lobbying expenditure records are held by the Senate Office of Public Records. In South Australia, the company is represented by lobbying company Richardson Coutts Pty Ltd.

In 2017, Royal Caribbean agreed to use Port Everglades as a preferred berth for its Oasis class ships. The new agreement extended the past contract with Port Everglades until 2026, contingent upon a $100 million remodeling of Cruise Terminal 25, and approved by the Broward County Board of County Commissioners.

In December 2020, during the COVID-19 pandemic, Royal Caribbean suspended sailings across its fleet. It also sold Empress of the Seas and Majesty of the Seas, with the former going to Cordelia Cruises. As of 12 January 2021, its first and only ship to resume sailing was Quantum of the Seas, which began sailing from Singapore in December 2020 under health and safety regulations formulated by the Singapore government.

On 29 June 2021, Royal Caribbean International's Ovation of the Seas became the first cruise ship to return to the Port of Seattle since the COVID-19 pandemic began.

=== Partnerships/capabilities ===
In August 2022, the company announced that it would partner with SpaceX to use its Starlink technology across all its ships, in an effort to improve historically weak internet connections. This comes on the heels of the Federal Communications Commission authorizing SpaceX to provide its services to boats, planes, and trucks.

== Private resorts ==
Royal Caribbean operates two privately owned resorts that are used as stops on some Caribbean and Bahamas itineraries. They are Labadee, a resort on the northern coast of Haiti, and CocoCay, a private island in the Berry Islands region of the Bahamas. Royal Caribbean established the Royal Beach Club on Paradise Island in Nassau, Bahamas, in December 2025.

The company is planning to open additional private resorts in Cozumel in Mexico and on Lelepa Island, Vanuatu in the South Pacific.

== Fleet ==
=== Current fleet ===
Since Sovereign of the Seas entered service in 1987, all subsequent Royal Caribbean ships have names ending with the phrase "of the Seas".

==== Vision class ====
The Vision class consists of three pairs of sister ships. Legend and Splendour, built at Chantiers de l'Atlantique, Saint-Nazaire, France have a gross tonnage of approximately 70,000. Grandeur and Enchantment were built at Kvaerner Masa-Yards, Helsinki, Finland and had an original tonnage of approximately 73,000 GT. The final pair, Rhapsody and Vision were also built at Chantiers de l'Atlantique, and have a tonnage of 78,000 GT. In 2005, a 74-foot (23 m) midsection was added to Enchantment of the Seas, bringing its tonnage to over 80,000 GT. All ships of this class feature over 2 acres (8,100 m^{2}) of glass. Royal Caribbean sold both Splendour of the Seas and Legend of the Seas to Marella Cruises. Splendour of the Seas last sailed for Royal Caribbean on 4 April 2016, and the final Legend of the Seas sailing for Royal Caribbean left port on 13 March 2017. In October 2019, Royal Caribbean announced a plan to transfer Grandeur of the Seas to Pullmantur Cruises after its last scheduled sailing on 21 March 2021. However, following Pullmantur's filing for bankruptcy, Royal Caribbean later announced in August 2020 that Grandeur would remain in Royal Caribbean's fleet.

Name	Year built	Gross tonnage	Berths		Flag	Notes	Ship image
Name	Year built	Gross tonnage	Double	Maximum	Flag	Notes	Ship image
Built in Kvaerner Masa-Yards
Grandeur of the Seas	1996	73,817	1,992	2,440	Bahamas	Last renovated in 2012.	
Enchantment of the Seas	1997	82,910	2,252	2,730	Bahamas	Lengthened in 2005. Last renovated in 2013.	
Built in Chantiers de l'Atlantique
Rhapsody of the Seas	1997	78,878	1,998	2,416	Bahamas	Last renovated in 2012.	
Vision of the Seas	1998	78,717	2,050	2,514	Bahamas	Last renovated in 2013.	

==== Voyager class ====
The Voyager-class ships were the largest class of cruise ships in the world when constructed, were the first ships to have an ice rink at sea and the first to have Royal Caribbean's "Royal Promenade" concept, a main thoroughfare extending most of the length of the ship, flanked by bars, cafes, and shopping venues. They were built at Kvaerner Masa-Yards' (now Meyer Turku) facility in Turku, Finland. They have a gross tonnage of around 137,000 tonnes. Ships introduced onboard amenities, including sports facilities and themed public spaces.

Navigator of the Seas and Mariner of the Seas are second-generation Voyager-class vessels, and feature glass stateroom balconies that extend out from the superstructure of the ship and a larger Windjammer buffet area.

Name	Year built	Gross tonnage	Berths		Flag	Notes	Ship image
Name	Year built	Gross tonnage	Double	Maximum	Flag	Notes	Ship image
Voyager of the Seas	1999	138,194	3,114	3,840	Bahamas	Last renovated in 2019.	
Explorer of the Seas	2000	138,194	3,114	3,840	Bahamas	Planned renovation postponed.	
Adventure of the Seas	2001	138,193	3,114	3,807	Bahamas	Last renovated in 2016.	
Navigator of the Seas	2002	139,999	3,376	4,000	Cyprus	Last renovated in 2019.	
Mariner of the Seas	2003	139,863	3,114	3,807	Bahamas	Last renovated in 2018.	

==== Radiance class ====
All Radiance-class ships have a gross tonnage of 90,090 and environmentally friendlier gas turbine engines. The Radiance-class ships have over 3 acres (12,000 m^{2}) of glass, glass exterior viewing elevators, over 700 balcony staterooms, two-level glass windowed dining rooms, alternative restaurants, a retractable glass roof over a pool, an outdoor pool, as well as the first self-leveling billiard tables at sea. The Radiance class ships were constructed at Meyer Werft, Papenburg, Germany. Unlike the preceding Voyager class, these ships are built to the Panamax form factor, allowing them to pass through the Panama Canal.

Name	Year built	Gross tonnage	Berths		Flag	Notes	Ship image
Name	Year built	Gross tonnage	Double	Maximum	Flag	Notes	Ship image
Radiance of the Seas	2001	90,090	2,143	2,466	Bahamas	Last renovated in 2011.	
Brilliance of the Seas	2002	90,090	2,142	2,543	Bahamas	Last renovated in 2013.	
Serenade of the Seas	2003	90,090	2,146	2,476	Bahamas	Last renovated in 2012.	
Jewel of the Seas	2004	90,090	2,112	2,502	Bahamas	Last renovated in 2016.	

==== Freedom class ====
The Freedom-class ships are lengthened versions of the second-generation Voyager-class ship, and contain a 400-foot (120 m) Royal Promenade mall running much of the length of the ship, an ice skating rink, basketball court, several pools, a mini-golf course, and a rock wall. New features on the Freedom class include the FlowRider surfing simulator, the H2O Zone kids water play area, a boxing ring, and hot tubs cantilevered over the side of the ship. At 154,407 gross tons, the Freedom-class ships were the largest ships in the world from 2006, until the debut of the Oasis class in 2009.

Name	Year built	Gross tonnage	Berths		Flag	Notes	Ship image
Name	Year built	Gross tonnage	Double	Maximum	Flag	Notes	Ship image
Freedom of the Seas	2006	156,271	3,782	4,515	Bahamas	Last renovated in 2020.	
Liberty of the Seas	2007	155,889	3,798	4,960	Bahamas	Last renovated in 2016.	
Independence of the Seas	2008	155,889	3,634	4,375	Bahamas	Last renovated in 2018.	

==== Oasis class ====
The Oasis-class ships are among the largest passenger ships ever built, having surpassed the Freedom-class ships, and are surpassed only by the Icon-class ships. They can accommodate up to 5,400 passengers at double occupancy and they have a maximum capacity of 6,296 passengers. Furthermore, the ships have a gross tonnage of at least 225,282 tons, and cost the line around US$1.4 billion each. The first two ships in the class, Oasis of the Seas and Allure of the Seas, were delivered in 2009 and 2010 by STX Europe Turku Shipyard, Finland. The third and fourth ships in the class, Harmony of the Seas and Symphony of the Seas were built at Chantiers de l'Atlantique in Saint-Nazaire, France. They introduced the Ultimate Abyss dry slide feature. Royal Caribbean International, in conjunction with USA Today, sponsored a contest to name the first two vessels. In February 2019, Royal Caribbean announced the order of a 6th Oasis class vessel, later named Utopia of the Seas, from Chantiers de l'Atlantique for delivery in 2024 with a double occupancy of 5,714 and gross tonnage of 231,000.

Name	Year built	Gross tonnage	Berths		Flag	Notes	Ship image
Name	Year built	Gross tonnage	Double	Maximum	Flag	Notes	Ship image
Built in STX Finland
Oasis of the Seas	2009	226,838	5,400	6,780	Bahamas	Last renovated in 2019.	
Allure of the Seas	2010	225,282	5,492	6,780	Bahamas	Last renovated in 2025.	
Built in Chantiers de l'Atlantique
Harmony of the Seas	2016	226,963	5,497	6,687	Bahamas		
Symphony of the Seas	2018	228,081	5,518	6,680	Bahamas		
Wonder of the Seas	2022	235,600	5,734	6,988	Bahamas		
Utopia of the Seas	2024	236,473	5,668		Bahamas	1st LNG powered Oasis class cruise ship.	

==== Quantum class ====
The Quantum-class of ships debuted as the second largest class of cruise ships in the world. The Quantum-class ships were the first ships built for Royal Caribbean by Meyer Werft since the Radiance class and share many features with those ships, including indoor pools with retractable roofs, vast expanses of glass, outdoor seating in the "Windjammer" buffet, and self-leveling pool tables. Other distinctive features of the Quantum-class include the "North Star" observation capsule mounted on the end of a 41-meter-long (135 ft) crane arm, "RipCord by iFLY" a skydiving simulator, the three-deck-high Two70° lounge and performance venue at the aft of the ship featuring panoramic windows that convert into projection screens, and the multi-purpose SeaPlex facility which hosts activities such as basketball, roller skating, bumper cars, and a trapeze school. The Quantum class was the first class designed specifically for Dynamic Dining, and feature several separate complementary dining facilities instead of a single main dining room. Each venue will maintain the same menu and staff throughout the cruise. Unlike the earlier Voyager, Freedom, and Oasis class, Quantum-class ships do not feature a Viking Crown Lounge or ice skating rink, and the Royal Esplanade mall down the center of the ship is not featured in the traditional form of Royal Promenades.

Five ships, Quantum of the Seas, Anthem of the Seas, Ovation of the Seas, Spectrum of the Seas, and Odyssey of the Seas were built as of 2021.

Name	Year built	Gross tonnage	Berths		Flag	Notes	Ship image
Name	Year built	Gross tonnage	Double	Maximum	Flag	Notes	Ship image
Quantum of the Seas	2014	168,666	4,180	4,905	Bahamas	Renovation planned for 2024	
Anthem of the Seas	2015	168,666	4,180	4,905	Bahamas		
Ovation of the Seas	2016	168,666	4,180	4,905	Bahamas	Amplified April 2026	
Spectrum of the Seas	2019	169,379	4,246	5,622	Cyprus	First Quantum Ultra Class ship	
Odyssey of the Seas	2021	167,704	4,200	5,510	Bahamas	2nd Quantum Ultra-class cruise ship	

==== Icon class ====
On 10 October 2016, Royal Caribbean and Meyer Turku announced an order to build two ships under the project name "Icon". Royal Caribbean plans to have at least seven Icon-class ships. Icon class ships are the largest cruise ships ever constructed and are powered by liquefied natural gas (LNG).

Name	Year built	Gross tonnage	Berths		Flag	Notes	Ship image
Name	Year built	Gross tonnage	Double	Maximum	Flag	Notes	Ship image
Icon of the Seas	2023	248,663	5,610	7,600	Bahamas	1st LNG powered ship in the fleet, largest cruise ship in the world by gross tonnage	
Star of the Seas	2025	248,663	5,610	7,600	Bahamas		
Legend of the Seas	2026	248,663	5,610	7,600	Bahamas		

=== Future fleet ===
Name	Class	Estimated date of completion	Current status	Gross tonnage	Berths		Notes	Ship image
Name	Class	Estimated date of completion	Current status	Gross tonnage	Double	Maximum	Notes	Ship image
Hero of the Seas	Icon class	2027	Floated out on 8 September 2026	250,800			4th Icon class	
TBA	Oasis class	2028	Keel laid on 12 June 2026	236,860	5,668		7th Oasis class	
TBA	Icon class	2028	Keel laid on 14 September 2026				5th Icon class	
TBA	Discovery class	2029					First ship in a class of two, with options for four more ships	
TBA	Icon class	2029	Ordered				6th Icon class	
TBA	Icon class	2030	Ordered				7th Icon class.	
TBA	Discovery class	2032	Ordered				2nd Discovery class	

Royal Caribbean is also planning a new class of ships to follow the Icon-class. Those ships will be built at Meyer Turku until 2036.

=== Former fleet ===
Name	Class	Year built	Duration in service for Royal Caribbean International	Current status	Gross tonnage	Notes	Ship image
Song of Norway	Song of Norway class	1970	1970–1997	Scrapped in 2013 as the Formosa Queen.	22,945	Lengthened in 1978	
Nordic Prince	Song of Norway class	1971	1971–1995	Scrapped in 2015 as the Pacific	23,149	Lengthened in 1980	
Sun Viking	Song of Norway class	1972	1972–1998	Sold for scrap in 2021.	16,607		
Song of America	Song of America class	1982	1982–1999	Sold for Scrap in 2025	37,584		
Viking Serenade	-	1982	1990–2002	Scrapped in 2018 as the Ocean Gala 1.	40,171	Transferred from Royal Caribbean's subsidiary Admiral Cruises in 1990.	
Sovereign of the Seas	Sovereign class	1987	1988–2008	Scrapped in 2020 as the Sovereign	73,192	Largest cruise ship from 1987 to 1990.	
Monarch of the Seas	Sovereign class	1991	1991–2013	Scrapped in 2020 as the Monarch	73,192		
Splendour of the Seas	Vision class	1996	1996–2016	Operating as the Marella Discovery for Marella Cruises	69,130		
Legend of the Seas	Vision class	1995	1995–2017	Operating as the Marella Discovery 2 for Marella Cruises	69,130		
Empress of the Seas	Empress class	1990	1990–2008 2016–2020	Sold to Cordelia Cruises	48,563	Sailed for Pullmantur Cruises as Empress from 2008 to 2016.	
Majesty of the Seas	Sovereign class	1992	1992–2020	Sold to Seajets and renamed Majesty of the Oceans	78,941		

== Ports of call ==
Royal Caribbean operates internationally and has many ports of call.

=== International ports ===

Territory	Port	City
Netherlands	Port of Amsterdam	Amsterdam
Spain	Port of Barcelona	Barcelona
Canada	Port of Quebec	Quebec
China	Port of Shenzhen	Shenzhen
Sweden	Port of Stockholm	Stockholm
Canada	Port of Vancouver	Vancouver
New Zealand	Port of Auckland	Auckland
China	Port of Tianjin	Beijing
Italy	Port of Civitavecchia	Rome
Singapore	Port of Singapore	Singapore
Australia	Port Jackson	Sydney
Italy	Port of Venice	Venice
Denmark	Port of Copenhagen	Copenhagen
Hong Kong	Port of Hong Kong	Hong Kong
Australia	Port of Melbourne	Melbourne
China	Port of Shanghai	Shanghai
United Kingdom	Port of Southampton	Southampton
India	Marmagao Port	Goa

=== U.S. Ports ===

Territory	Port	City
Florida	Port Everglades	Fort Lauderdale
New Jersey	Cape Liberty	Bayonne
Hawaii	Honolulu Harbor	Honolulu
Florida	PortMiami	Miami
Washington	Port of Seattle	Seattle
Texas	Port of Galveston	Galveston
California	Port of Los Angeles	Los Angeles
Louisiana	Port of New Orleans	New Orleans
California	Port of San Diego	San Diego
Alaska	Port of Seward	Seward
Maryland	Port of Baltimore	Baltimore
Massachusetts	Port of Boston	Boston
Florida	Port Canaveral	Cape Canaveral
Florida	Port Tampa Bay	Tampa
Puerto Rico	Port of San Juan	San Juan

== Awards ==
Travel awards include

- "Best Cruise Line Overall" 2016 by Travel Weekly
- "Cruise Line of the Year 2018" by Cruisedaily

== Controversies ==
Cruise line operators have been criticized for using their large economic impact to cut deals over ship-generated waste with home ports, ports of call, and agencies.

=== Norovirus outbreaks ===
In January 2014, an outbreak of norovirus aboard Explorer of the Seas sickened 689 of 4,237 passengers and crew (16.3%), causing the ship to return to port two days early. The outbreak was reported as one of the largest cruise ship illness incidents in two decades. Royal Caribbean offered all passengers aboard that cruise a 50% refund of their cruise fare, an additional 50% (plus 10% for each day sick passengers were quarantined) of their cruise fare as a credit towards another cruise, and reimbursed extra travel expenses for guests returning home early.

=== Docking in Haiti ===
In the aftermath of the 2010 Haiti earthquake, Royal Caribbean continued docking cruise ships at the Labadee resort, located approximately 60 miles from the epicenter of the earthquake, during the ongoing humanitarian crisis. Royal Caribbean vice president John Weis stated that relief supplies were delivered and proceeds went toward relief efforts. The decision to continue docking was criticized nonetheless and created concern among passengers.

=== George Allen Smith case ===
On 5 July 2005, passengers on board Brilliance of the Seas reported what appeared to be blood on a part of the ship below the passenger balconies. After a search, George Allen Smith was discovered to be missing and thought to have fallen overboard. A criminal investigation into possible foul play was conducted, and a brief press release on the company's investor relations website announced the settlement of the case, later revealed to be more than $1 million.

=== Environmental record ===
In 1998 and 1999, the company was fined US$9 million because one of its ships, Sovereign of the Seas, had repeatedly dumped oily waste into the ocean and tried to hide this using false records, including fake piping diagrams given to the U.S. Coast Guard. Because the company was and is incorporated in Liberia, Royal Caribbean argued that this case was not in the jurisdiction of U.S. courts. Despite their argument, they were unsuccessful.

In 2024, the Environmental Protection Agency fined Royal Caribbean International $475,000 for failing to properly report solid and hazardous waste management and handling between July 2019 and July 2024.

=== Whakaari / White Island eruption ===
On 9 December 2019, a volcanic eruption occurred killing 21 people from Ovation of the Seas. It occurred on New Zealand's Whakaari / White Island while Ovation was docked in the nearby Port of Tauranga. Despite an increase in seismic activity in preceding weeks, 47 people (including 38 passengers and crew from the ship) were on the island when it erupted. As of December 10, 2019, 44 of the 47 were injured, missing, or killed. A Royal Caribbean spokesperson said the line was "devastated by today’s events", and the ship remained in port until 10 December to assist with recovery efforts. In April 2020, legal action was commenced in Australia on behalf of relatives and Ovation passengers against Royal Caribbean.

=== Death of Chloe Rae Margaret Wiegand ===
On 7 July 2019, 18-month-old Chloe Rae Margaret Wiegand was dropped to her death from an open window by her grandfather Salvatore Anello on Freedom of the Seas while docked in San Juan, Puerto Rico. He was later arrested on counts of homicide by authorities in Puerto Rico. The family attempted to file a civil suit against Royal Caribbean claiming that Anello did not know the window was open. Royal Caribbean later released several videos from surveillance cameras showing this incident. As of 25 February 2020, Anello took a plea deal with authorities. However, the civil lawsuit was still approved by a judge.

=== COVID-19 pandemic ===
During the COVID-19 pandemic, the Miami Herald reported that, after cruises were cancelled worldwide and they had disembarked all passengers, Royal Caribbean Cruises had refused to repatriate many of their crew members due to the associated costs, with many crew members turning to desperate measures, such as hunger strikes, as a result.

As part of the Cruise Line International Association (CLIA), Royal Caribbean paused its global sailing operations through 30 April 2021.

On 16 June 2021, Royal Caribbean International announced that it was delaying the inaugural sailing of their newest cruise liner, Odyssey of the Seas after eight crew members tested positive for SARS-CoV-2–COVID-19. Six of the crew members were without showing signs of symptoms while the other two were experiencing mild symptoms of the disease. The delay was extended until 31 July 2021.

== See also ==
- PortMiami
- Tourism in Florida (Miami)
- Private island
- Royal Caribbean Group
