= Ovation of the Seas =

Quantum-class cruise ship

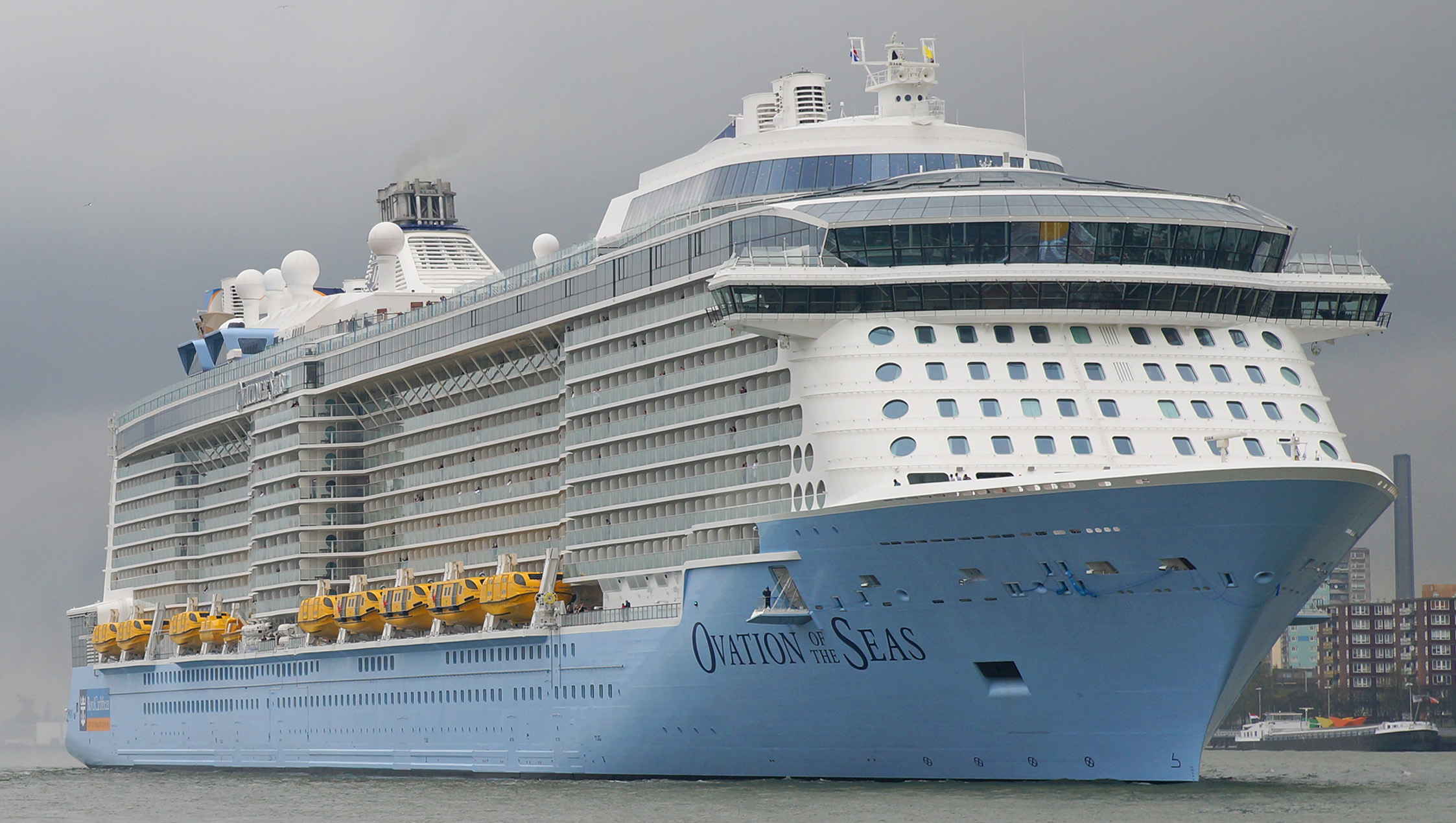
- Ovation of the Seas docked in Rotterdam, Netherlands on her maiden voyage

History

Bahamas
- Name: Ovation of the Seas
- Owner: Royal Caribbean Group
- Operator: Royal Caribbean International
- Port of registry: Nassau, Bahamas
- Ordered: 13 September 2013
- Builder: Meyer Werft, Papenburg, Germany
- Laid down: 5 March 2015
- Launched: 18 February 2016 (float-out)
- Christened: 24 June 2016 by Fan Bingbing
- Completed: 8 April 2016
- Maiden voyage: 14 April 2016
- In service: 14 April 2016
- Refit: 16 March 2026–17 April 2026
- Identification: Call sign: C6BX9; IMO number: 9697753; MMSI number: 311000397; DNV ID: 34050
- Status: In service

General characteristics
- Class & type: Quantum-class cruise ship
- Tonnage: 168,666 GT
- Length: 348 m (1,141 ft 9 in)
- Beam: 41.2 m (135 ft 2 in) (waterline); 48.9 m (160 ft 5 in) (max)
- Height: 72 m (236 ft 3 in)
- Draught: 8.5 m (27 ft 11 in)
- Decks: 16 (14 passenger-accessible)
- Installed power: 2 × Wärtsilä 12V46F (2 × 14,400 kW); 2 × Wärtsilä 16V46F (2 × 19,200 kW); 2 × Cat 3516C HD (2 × 2,500 kW)
- Propulsion: Diesel-electric; 2 × ABB Azipod XO thrusters (2 × 20.5 MW); 4 × 3,500 kW (4,694 hp) Brunvoll FU115 bow thrusters
- Speed: 22 knots (41 km/h; 25 mph)
- Capacity: 4,180 passengers (double occupancy); 4,905 passengers (maximum occupancy)

Ovation of the Seas is a Quantum-class cruise ship owned by Royal Caribbean International (RCI) and the third ship of her class. The Quantum class is the fourth largest class of cruise ships behind MSC Cruises's Meraviglia class, Royal Caribbean International's Oasis class, and Royal Caribbean International's Icon Class by gross tonnage.

Ovation of the Seas mainly sails from Seattle during the northern summer season and re-positions to Sydney during the southern summer season.

== Concept and construction ==
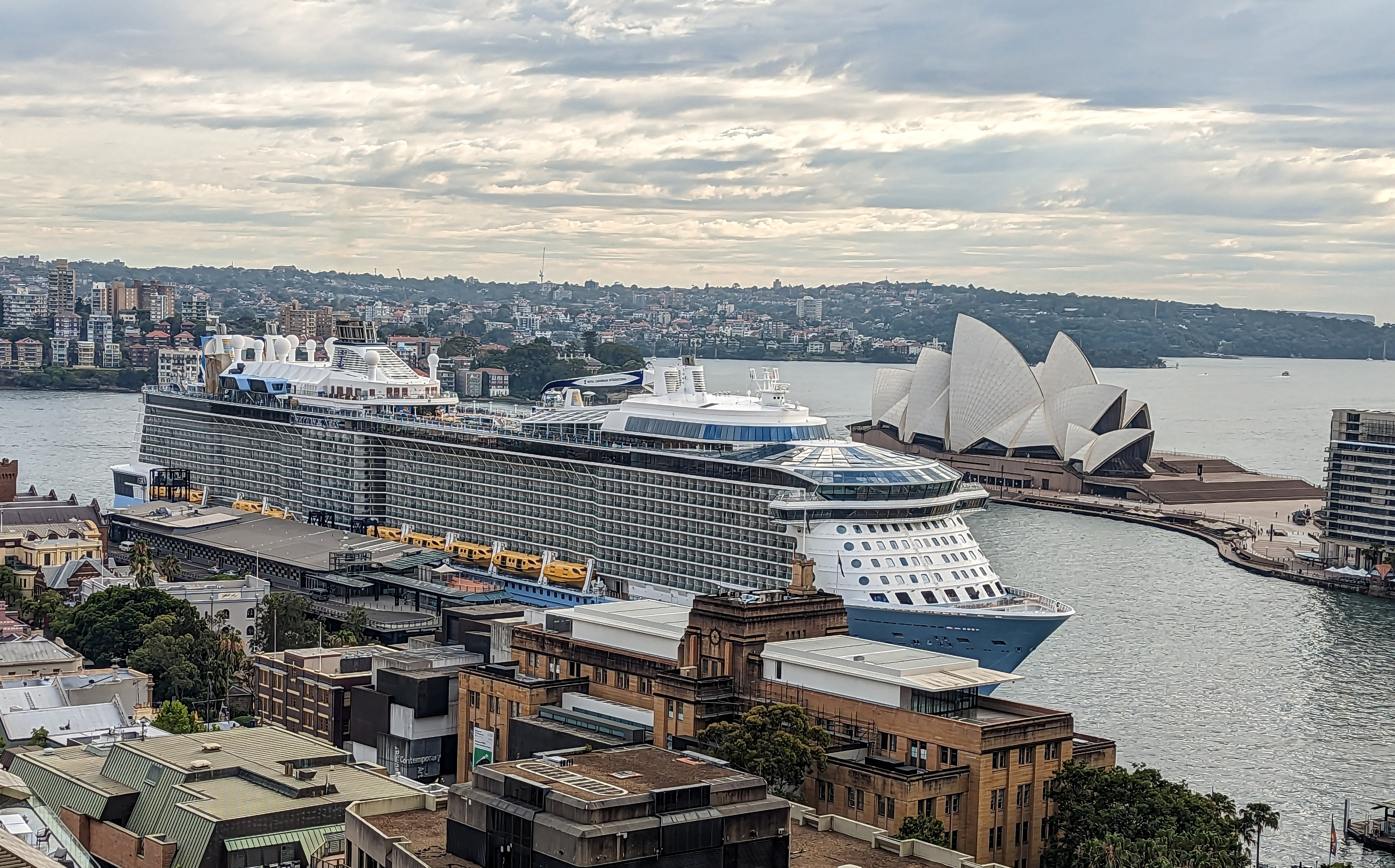
Ovation of the Seas, dominating Sydney Cove

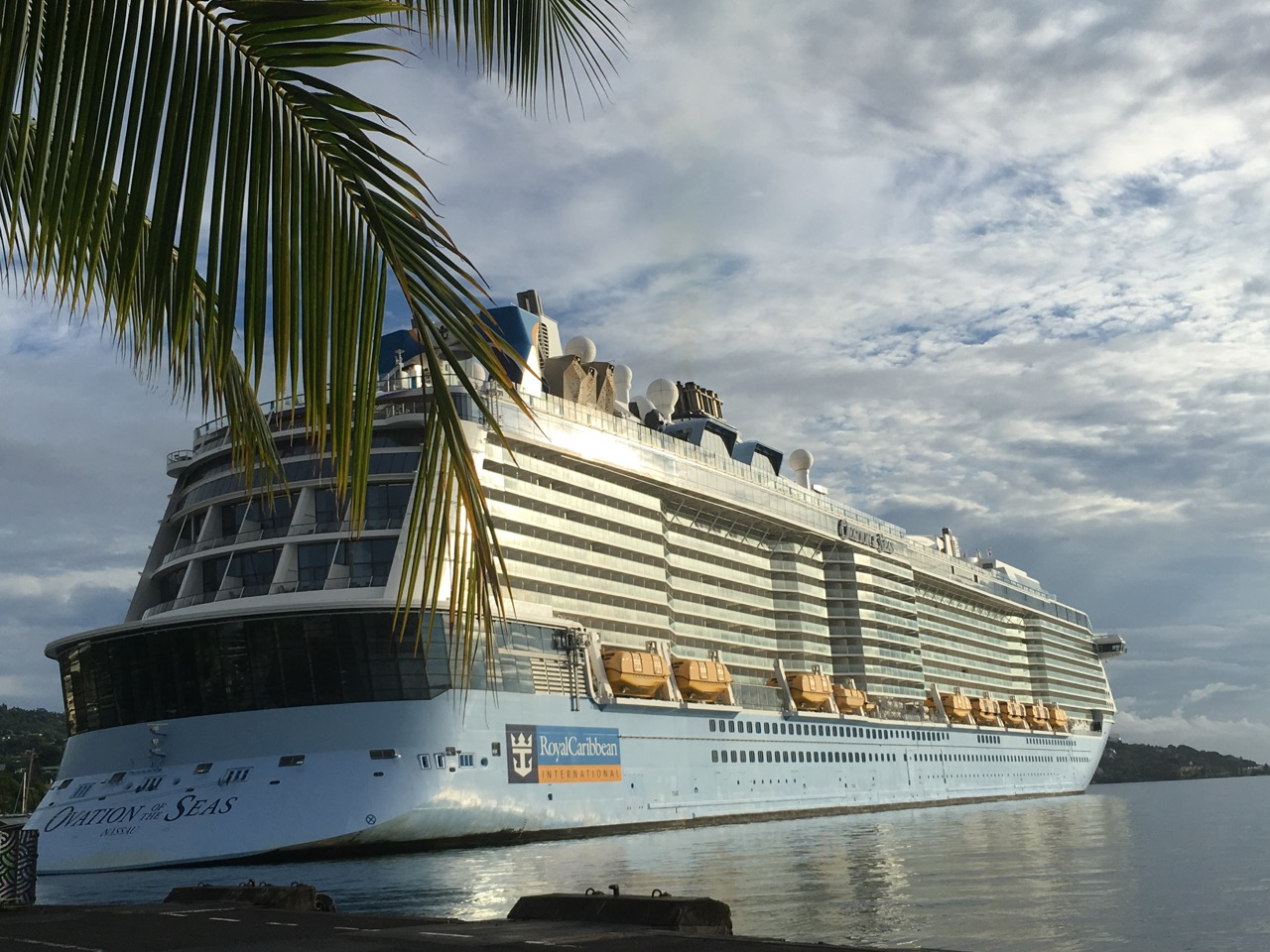
Ovation of the Seas at Tahiti on 24 April 2019

On 11 February 2011 RCI announced that it had ordered a new class of ships from the Meyer Werft shipyard in Papenburg, Germany, the first of which was scheduled to be delivered by autumn of 2014. At the time, the project was code-named "Project Sunshine". On 29 February 2012, the company announced that a second "Project Sunshine" ship had been ordered and would be delivered by Spring 2015. Just under a year later, on 31 January 2013, RCI announced that the official name of the new class of ships was the Quantum class.

The first steel for the third vessel in the Quantum class was cut on 18 September 2014, the same day its name was announced to be Ovation of the Seas. The keel was laid down by Meyer Werft on 5 March 2015. Before the first piece of the keel was lowered into place, Adam Goldstein, President and COO of Royal Caribbean Cruises Ltd., the holding company of RCI, placed a lucky coin in the dock. The keel was formed of 74 blocks. The first section was launched on 20 June 2015.

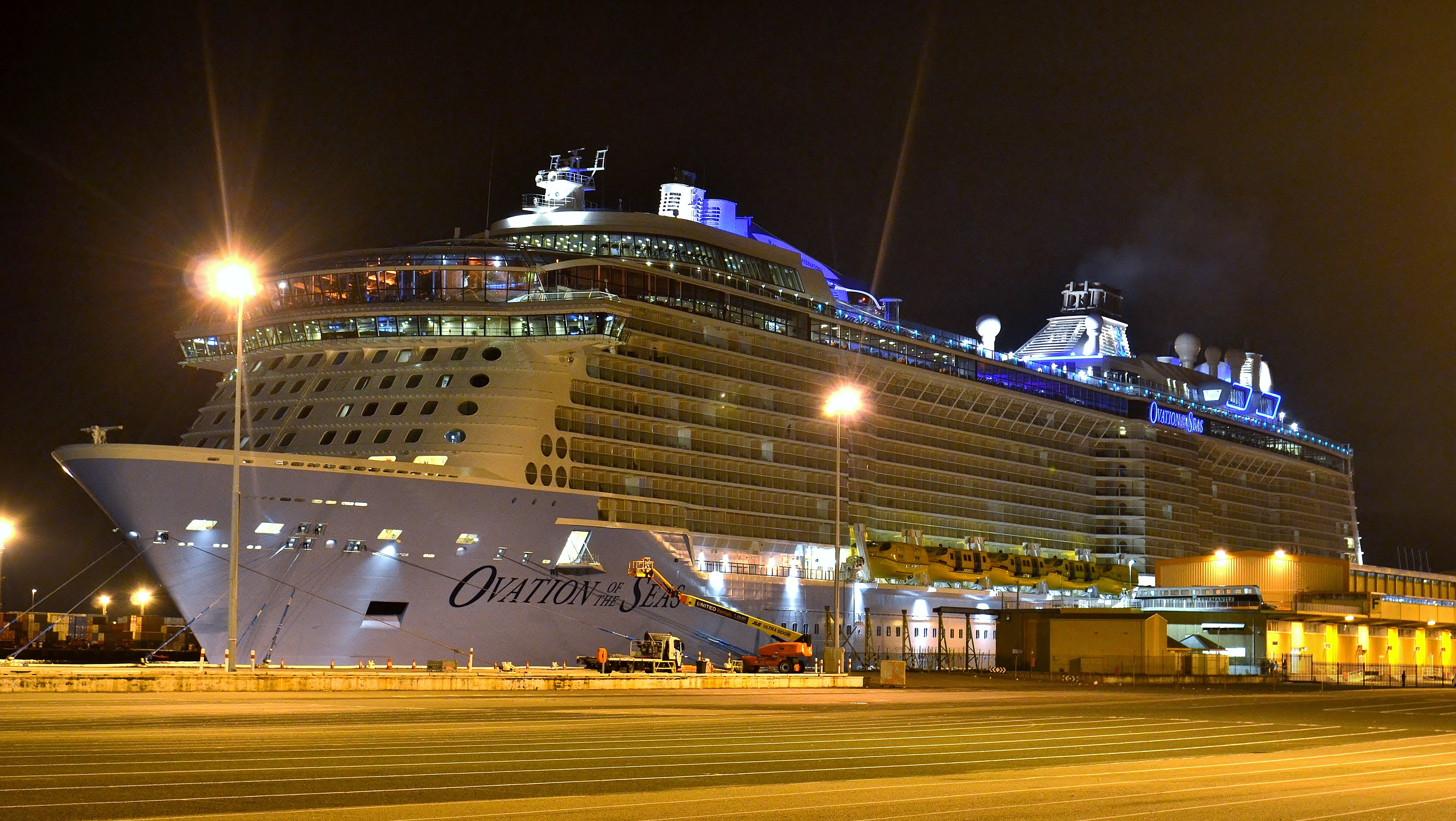
Ovation of the Seas at inner harbour of Fremantle Harbour, Western Australia in 2016 December

Ovation of the Seas was delivered on 8 April 2016 and entered service on 14 April 2016.

== Service history ==
Ovation of the Seas arrived from Hamburg to the Port of Southampton, UK on 10 April 2016, to begin a series of inaugural events, including press previews and a limited number of "Shake-down" and mini-cruises for VIPs, specially invited guests and members of the public. The ship berths at the City Cruise Terminal in the Western Docks, where its fleetmates also dock when visiting the city.

The ship was based in Hong Kong. The ship's christening ceremony was 24 June 2016 in Tianjin; the ship's godmother is Chinese actress Fan Bingbing.

=== White Island eruption ===
On 9 December 2019, a volcanic eruption occurred on New Zealand's White Island (Whakaari) while Ovation of the Seas was docked in the nearby Port of Tauranga. There were 47 people, including 38 passengers and crew from the ship on the island when it erupted, despite an increase in seismic activity in recent weeks. The eruption killed 22 people and injured 25. A spokesperson said the line was "devastated by today's events", and the ship remained in port until 11 December to assist with recovery efforts. The captain offered refunds to all passengers on board the ship.

=== 2020: spread of COVID-19 ===
In March 2020 thousands of passengers were ordered to self-isolate after disembarking from the ship in Sydney, Australia on 18 March due to COVID-19 fears. 79 passengers subsequently tested positive for the virus. As of 1 April, the ship was located off the coast of New South Wales. The International Transport Workers' Federation had called on the Australian government to allow the crew members to be disembarked so that they could be flown to their countries of residence. They formed part of 15,000 crew members in 18 cruise ships sitting off the Australian coast during the pandemic.

On 2 April, a 75-year-old former passenger died in Wollongong Hospital. The ship departed Australia on 4 April 2020 with its crew.

=== Amplification ===
In March 2026, Ovation of the Seas underwent a major amplification in the Seatrium Tuas Shipyard, in Singapore, which added the Lime & Coconut bar and refreshed pool deck, Giovanni’s Italian Kitchen, Izumi Teppanyaki, the Pesky Parrot tiki bar, expanded casino, and new cabins like the Panoramic & Ultimate Family Suites.

In November 2026, one of the ship's pianists was found treading water in the Pacific Ocean twenty miles off the coast of California, having reportedly fallen overboard.
