= Quantum-class cruise ship =

Cruise ship class

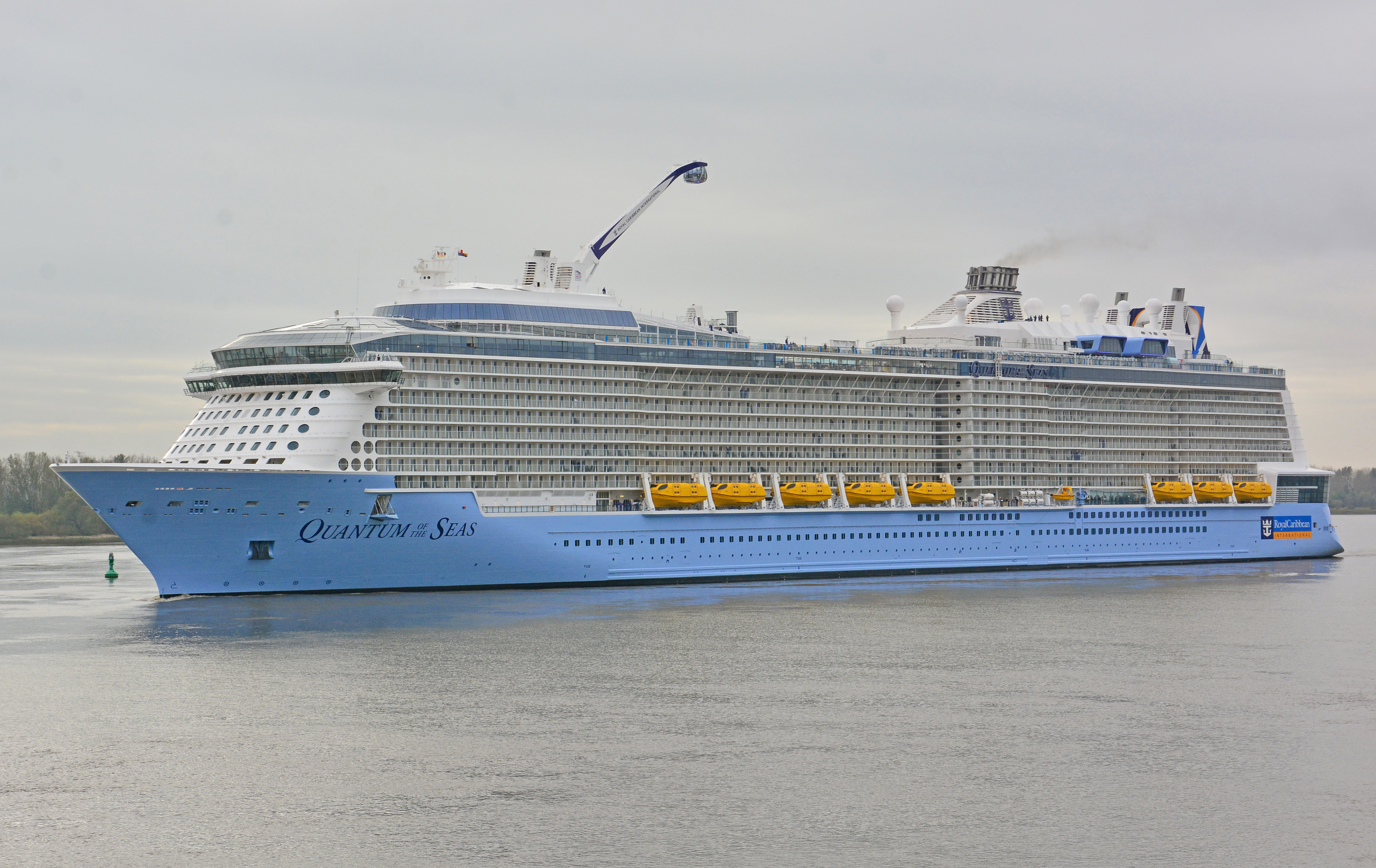
- Quantum of the Seas, the lead vessel of the Quantum class

Class overview
- Builders: Meyer Werft, Papenburg, Germany
- Operators: Royal Caribbean International
- Preceded by: Freedom class; Oasis class
- Succeeded by: Icon class
- Subclasses: Quantum-Ultra Class
- In service: 2014-present
- Planned: 5
- Completed: 5
- Active: 5

General characteristics
- Type: Cruise ship
- Tonnage: 168,666 GT
- Length: 348 m (1,141 ft 9 in)
- Beam: 48.9–49.47 m (160 ft 5 in – 162 ft 4 in) (max); 41.2–41.4 m (135 ft 2 in – 135 ft 10 in) (waterline)
- Height: 72 m (236 ft 3 in)
- Draught: 8.5–8.8 m (27 ft 11 in – 28 ft 10 in)
- Decks: 18 (16 passenger-accessible)
- Installed power: 2 × Wärtsilä 12V46F (2 × 14,400 kW); 2 × Wärtsilä 16V46F (2 × 19,200 kW); 2 × Cat 3516C HD (2 × 2,500 kW)
- Propulsion: Diesel-electric; 2 × ABB Azipod XO thrusters (2 × 20.5 MW); 4 × 3,500 kW (4,694 hp) Brunvoll FU115 bow thrusters
- Speed: 22 knots (41 km/h; 25 mph)
- Capacity: 4,180 passengers (double occupancy); 4,905 passengers (maximum occupancy)

The Quantum class is a class of cruise ships from Royal Caribbean International, previously known by the code name Project Sunshine.

== History ==
=== Quantum class ===
On 11 February 2011, Royal Caribbean announced that they had ordered the first of a new class of ships from Meyer Werft, scheduled to be delivered by Fall 2014. At the time, the project was code-named "Project Sunshine". Later that year, two 20.5-megawatt ABB Azipod XO propulsion units were ordered for that ship. On 29 February 2012, the company announced that a second "Project Sunshine" ship had been ordered and would be delivered by Spring 2015, and ordered identical Azipod propulsion units shortly thereafter. Just under a year later, on 31 January 2013, steel cutting was performed for the first ship. The same day, Royal Caribbean announced the official name of the new class of ships, Quantum class, as well as the names of the first two ships in the class, Quantum of the Seas and Anthem of the Seas.

Quantum of the Seas was delivered on 28 October 2014. Quantum of the Seas spent its inaugural 2014–2015 season sailing from Cape Liberty in Bayonne, New Jersey. Beginning late June 2015, the ship began sailing three- to eight-night itineraries year-round from Shanghai to Japan and South Korea.

Anthem of the Seas was delivered to Royal Caribbean on 10 April 2015. The ship spent its inaugural 2015 season sailing from Southampton, Hampshire, UK.

On 30 May 2013, Royal Caribbean announced that they had signed a contract with Meyer Werft for a third Quantum-class ship for delivery in mid-2016. On 18 September 2014, the name of the third Quantum-class ship was announced to be Ovation of the Seas. Ovation of the Seas was delivered to Royal Caribbean on 8 April 2016. The ship was originally planned to homeport in Tianjin to sail in Asia, but moved to Sydney in June 2016 to begin cruising in Oceania seasonally. She debuted in Alaska in the summer of 2019.

=== Quantum Ultra class ===
On 7 May 2015, Royal Caribbean entered into an agreement with Meyer Werft for a fourth Quantum-class ship for delivery in 2019, subject to financing and other conditions. Royal Caribbean announced on 26 April 2017, that the fourth Quantum-class ship would not only be designed and based in the Asia-Pacific region; but will also be based on a new Quantum Ultra-class design. In June 2018, it was revealed that the fourth ship would be Spectrum of the Seas. It can accommodate 4,246 guests at double occupancy and 1,551 international crew members.

On 3 November 2015, Royal Caribbean entered into an agreement with Meyer Werft for a fifth Quantum-class ship, also a Quantum Ultra-class ship and the sister ship to the first Quantum Ultra-class ship. Scheduled to be delivered in April 2021, it was given the name, Odyssey of the Seas, on 1 February 2019. She is the first Quantum-class ship to be homeported in South Florida, at Port Everglades.

== Design ==
The Quantum class represented a different direction for Royal Caribbean. The Voyager- and Freedom-class designs evolved into the Oasis class, which was considered the pinnacle in terms of scale and facilities. By contrast, the Quantum-class lineage is closer to that of the Radiance class, which was designed for cruising in cooler climates. The Quantum class is smaller than the preceding Oasis class, just as the Radiance class is smaller than the preceding Voyager class. Nonetheless, despite not being Royal Caribbean's largest class of ship, the Quantum class has pioneered several new innovations to the cruise line.

=== Staterooms ===
Quantum-class ships have 16 passenger-accessible decks, 8 of which feature balcony staterooms overlooking the ocean. All balcony staterooms above the lifeboats are recessed into the superstructure and do not look down directly at the ocean. There are a total of 2,090 staterooms: 1,570 balcony staterooms, 147 ocean-view staterooms, and 373 inside staterooms. Of those staterooms, 34 are wheelchair accessible and 28 are studio staterooms for single travelers (including 12 studio staterooms with balconies). All aft-facing staterooms are 2-story "loft" suites. All interior staterooms feature a floor-to-ceiling, 80-inch high-definition TV screen showing live views from the outside of the ship, which Royal Caribbean calls a "Virtual Balcony". On average, staterooms on the Quantum class are 9 percent larger than those on the preceding Oasis class.

=== Features ===
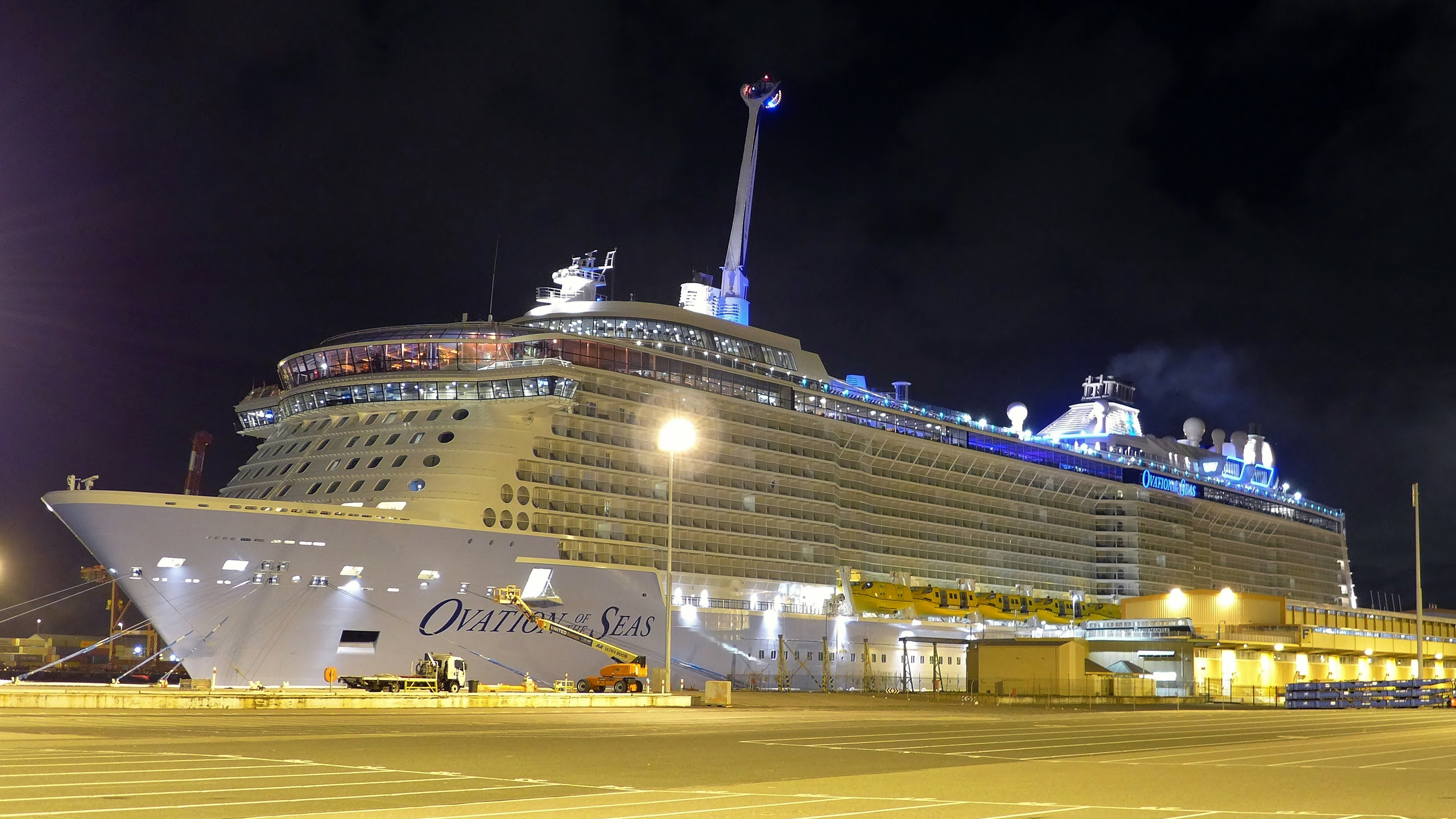
Ovation of the Seas with "North Star" observation tower raised, Fremantle Harbour, 2016

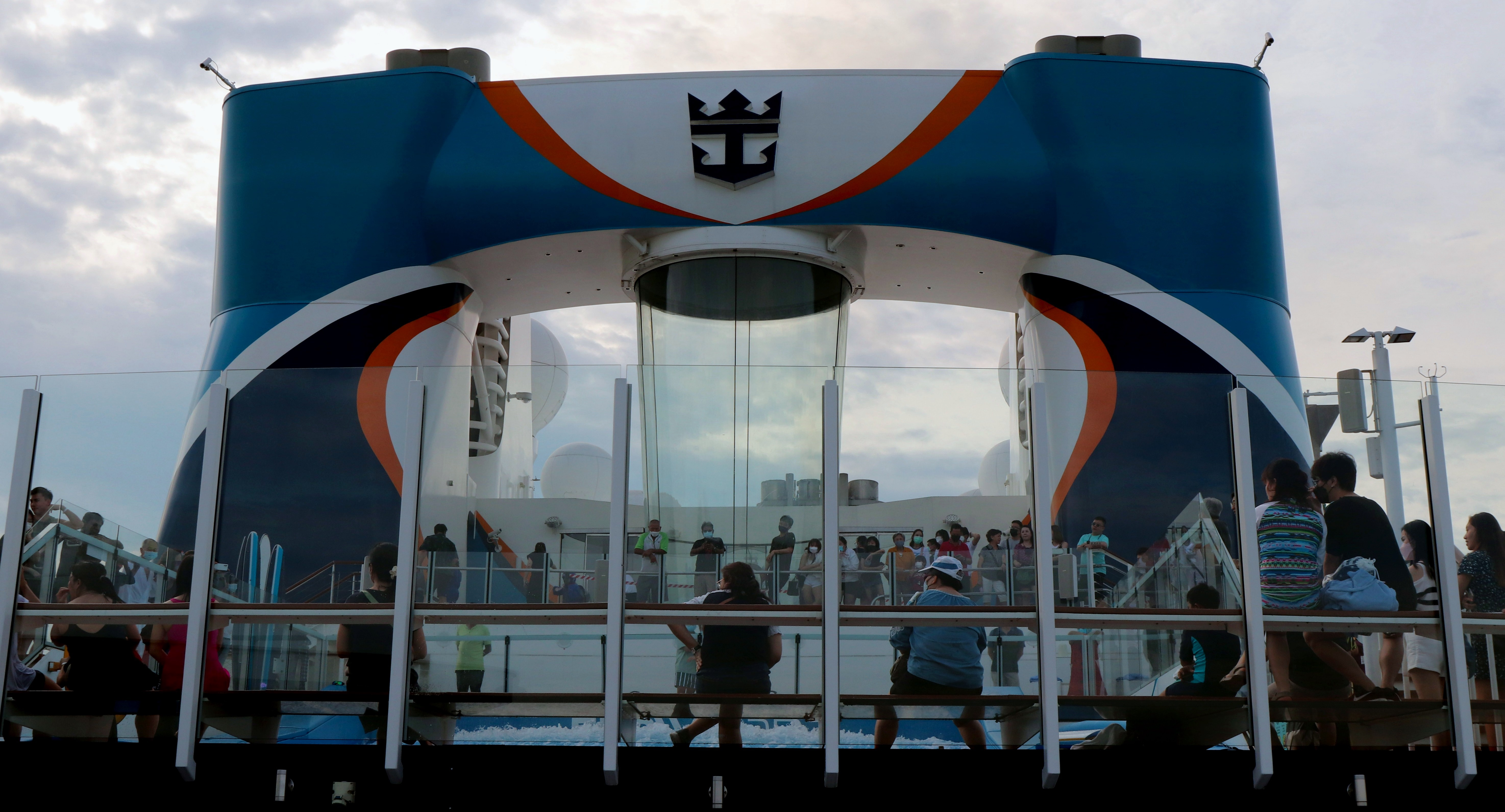
Spectrum of the Seas with "RipCord by iFLY" skydiving simulator, 2022

A new feature on the Quantum class is "RipCord by iFLY", a skydiving simulator set in a recirculating indoor recreational vertical wind tunnel. Another innovation on the Quantum class is the "North Star" observation tower, located at the forward end of the top deck. It uses a 7.1-tonne (7.8-short-ton) glass-walled capsule on the end of a 41-meter-long (135 ft) crane arm to lift groups of up to 14 guests up and over the edge of the ship, reaching heights of up to 91 metres (300 ft) above sea level.

Royal Caribbean introduced the first escape room experience on a cruise ship on the Anthem of the Seas in partnership with Puzzle Break, billed the "Escape from the Future." Spectrum of the Seas was the first Quantum-class ship to install Sky Pad, a virtual reality experience with a trampoline and bungee ropes for guests to undergo different simulations and play interactive games.

Like the earlier Freedom- and Oasis-class ships, the "Sports Court" on the aft of deck 15 features a complimentary Wave Loch Flowrider surf simulator and a rock-climbing wall. Other complimentary outdoor features are located on deck 14, including an outdoor pool with a large video screen, an indoor pool with a retractable roof, an indoor "Solarium" with an adults-only pool, and the "H2O Zone" kids' water park, featuring the first wave pool on a cruise ship, and at least four whirlpools. Throughout the ship, staples included on recent Royal Caribbean ships that are also in Quantum-class ships include a Spa and Fitness Center on decks 15 and 16, the "Adventure Ocean" kids club on decks 11 and 12, a Broadway-style "The Royal Theater" on decks 3–5, and a casino on deck 3. Unlike the earlier Voyager, Freedom, and Oasis classes, Quantum-class ships do not feature a Viking Crown Lounge or ice skating rink, and the Royal Promenade mall down the center of the ship is replaced with the two-story "Royal Esplanade".

=== Engineering ===
Quantum-class ships are powered by two Azipod XO thrusters that have a capacity of 20.5 MW (27,500 hp) and four bow thrusters with a power output of 3,500 kW (4,700 hp) each. The diesel-electric propulsion system powers the ships for a cruising speed of 22 knots (41 km/h; 25 mph). Wärtsilä provides the two scrubbers on each ship that enable a reduced sulfur emission output and a cleaner exhaust. Quantum-class ships use an air lubrication system (ALS) to reduce the friction in the water in order to improve the performance of the vessel during cruising.

== Ships ==
Name	Status	Entered service	Gross tonnage	Length	Notes	Image
=== Quantum-Class ===
Quantum of the Seas	In Service	2 November 2014	168,666 GT	347.7 m (1,141 ft)		
Anthem of the Seas	In Service	22 April 2015	168,666 GT	347.06 m (1,139 ft)		
Ovation of the Seas	In Service	14 April 2016	168,666 GT	348 m (1,141 ft 9 in)	Underwent amplification in March 2026.	
=== Quantum-Ultra Class ===
Spectrum of the Seas	In Service	18 April 2019	169,379 GT	347.11 m (1,139 ft)		
Odyssey of the Seas	In Service	31 July 2021	167,704 GT	347.08 m (1,138 ft 9 in)		
