= Odyssey of the Seas =

Quantum Ultra-class cruise ship

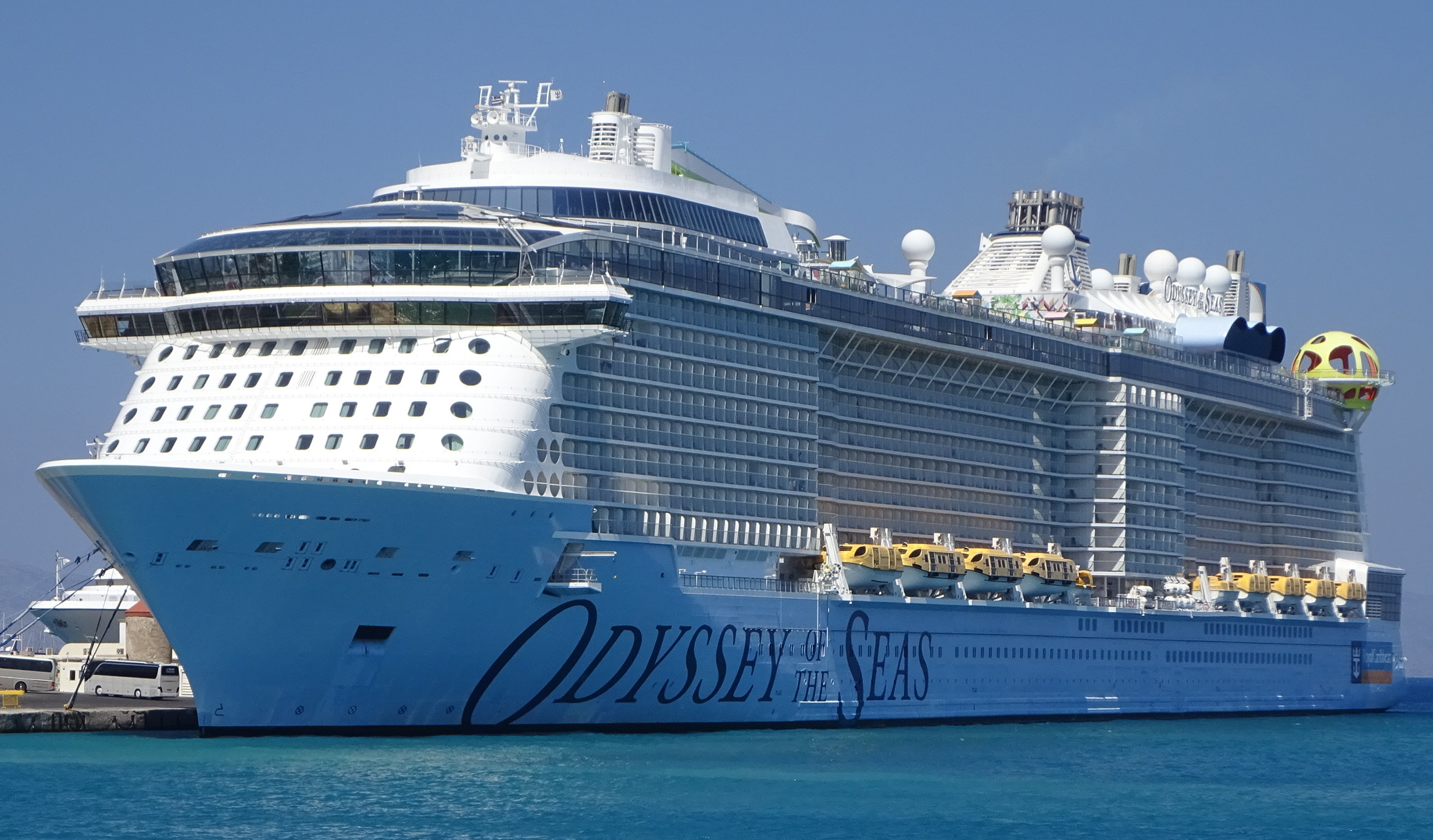
- Odyssey of the Seas in Rhodes, Greece on 8 September 2024

History
- Name: Odyssey of the Seas
- Owner: Royal Caribbean Group
- Operator: Royal Caribbean International
- Port of registry: Nassau, Bahamas
- Ordered: 12 June 2015
- Builder: Meyer Werft, Papenburg, Germany
- Launched: 28 November 2020
- Christened: 13 November 2021
- In service: 2021—present
- Identification: Call sign: C6EJ5; IMO number: 9795737; MMSI number: 311000912
- Status: In service

General characteristics
- Class & type: Quantum-class cruise ship
- Tonnage: 169.379 GT
- Length: 347.08 m (1,138 ft 9 in)
- Beam: 49.39 m (162 ft 0 in) (max); 41.39 m (135 ft 10 in) (waterline)
- Height: 72 m (236 ft 3 in)
- Draught: 8.733 m (28 ft 7.8 in)
- Depth: 11.45 m (37 ft 7 in)
- Decks: 16 (14 guest decks)
- Installed power: 67.2 MW
- Propulsion: 41 MW
- Speed: 22 knots (41 km/h; 25 mph)
- Capacity: 4,284 (double occupancy); 5,510 (max)
- Crew: 1,663

Odyssey of the Seas is the second Quantum Ultra-class cruise ship and the last of the class operated by Royal Caribbean International. She primarily operates in the Caribbean out of Cape Liberty Cruise Port in New Jersey.

== History ==
=== Planning ===
On 3 November 2015, Royal Caribbean entered into an agreement with Meyer Werft for a fifth Quantum-class ship, Originally scheduled to be delivered in Fall 2020, the delivery later was postponed until 2021. It was given the name, Odyssey of the Seas, on 1 February 2019. On 12 September 2019, it was announced that Odyssey of the Seas would homeport at Port Everglades.

=== Construction ===
Construction began with the steel cutting ceremony on 1 February 2019. The keel was laid on 3 May 2019. The coin ceremony was announced on the same day, featuring a coin being placed under the first block out of 79 total blocks of the vessel. Odyssey of the Seas floated out of Meyer Werft's shipyard on 28 November 2020.

On 28 February, the ship arrived in Eemshaven for final outfitting. On 13 March 2021, Meyer Werft announced the start of sea trials in the North Sea, and she finished her trials on 25 March 2021.

=== 2020 coronavirus pandemic ===
Due to the COVID-19 pandemic, it was announced in March 2020 that all operations would be suspended, including Odyssey of the Seas. After numerous delays, the inaugural sailing was pushed back to 3 July 2021. On 15 June 2021, it was announced that eight crew members got affected by coronavirus, leading the inaugural sailing being pushed back to 31 July 2021.

=== Delivery and christening ===
Odyssey of the Seas was officially delivered to Royal Caribbean on 31 March 2021 in a virtual ceremony due to the COVID-19 pandemic.

The inaugural sailing commenced on 31 July 2021, sailing an eight-day Southern Caribbean and Perfect Day cruise. On 13 November 2021, Bahamian Paralympic athlete Erin Brown christened the vessel in a ceremony in Port Everglades.

== Description and design ==
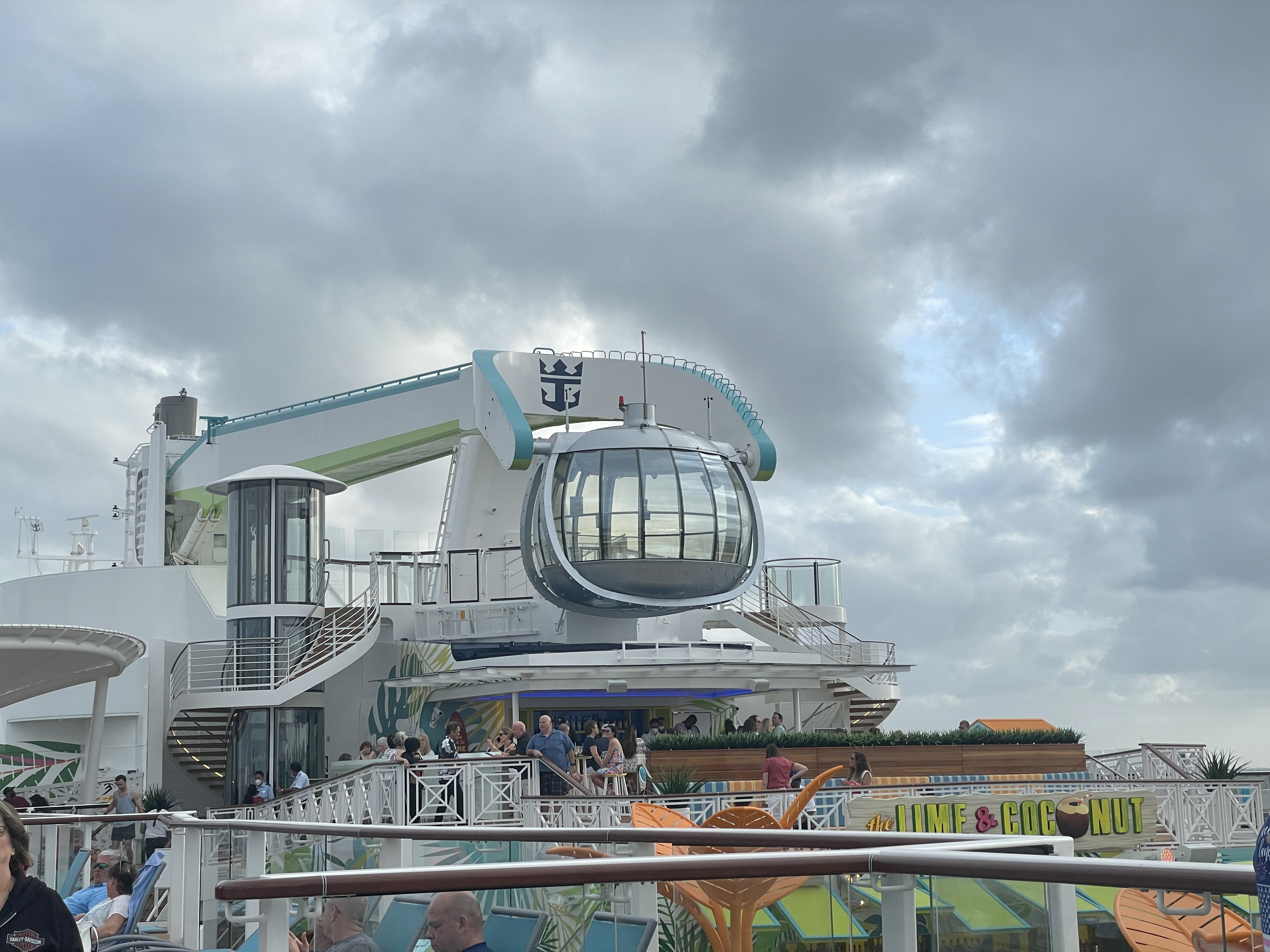
North Star on Odyssey of the Seas

Odyssey of the Seas measures 1,138 feet (347 m) and has a gross tonnage of 167,704, with 16 decks. The ship accommodates 4,198 passengers at double occupancy up to a maximum capacity of 5,510 passengers, as well as a 1,663 crew. There are 14 decks for guest use, 15 restaurants, 2 pools and 2,105 cabins.

Her facilities include a Wave Loch Flowrider surf simulator, a rock-climbing wall, a skydiving simulator, swimming pools, an observation pod, bumper cars, basketball court, a solarium, a Spa and Fitness Center, a theater and a casino.

Odyssey of the Seas was the first ship to include the large font for its logo on the side of the ship, representing the "bigger and bolder" Royal Caribbean.

== Incidents ==
In April 2021, prior to the ship's inaugural sailing, a crew member was lost after going overboard near Cyprus. After a search, the recovery mission was called off.

=== Migrant rescue ===
On 5 August 2024, the Hellenic Coast Guard flagged local vessels operating in the Mediterranean that a sailboat was in distress. The Odyssey of the Seas, en route to Santorini, stopped to assist the vessel, later bringing on board 77 migrants who were in danger. The Odyssey of the Seas missed their scheduled stop in Santorini to deliver the migrants to safety.

=== Passenger overboard ===
On 9 October 2026, a 44 year old female passenger from El Salvador jumped overboard with an inflatable ring while en route from Mykonos, Greece to Naples, Italy. The ship turned around and was circling the area while conducting search and rescue operations with the help of the Greek Coast Guard. The passenger was found and rescued a couple of hours later.
