= The Anthem =

The Anthem may refer to:

- "The Anthem" (Good Charlotte song), 2002
- "The Anthem" (Pitbull song), 2007
- "The Anthem" (Planetshakers song), 2012
- The Anthem (album), a 2005 album by Darin
- The Anthem (music venue), in Washington, DC
- "The Anthem", a 1999 song by Sway & King Tech, from the album This or That

== See also ==
- Anthem (disambiguation)
