= Messengers (American band) =

- Origin: Dallas, Texas
- Genres: Christian metal, death metal, thrash metal
- Years active: 2008–present
- Labels: Facedown, Strike First
- Members: Chad Paramore; Chance Paramore; Andy Rhodes
- Past members: Thomas (TK) Kilgore; Phillip Odom; Noah Boyce
- Website: facebook.com/messengerstx

Messengers is an American Christian metal band, and they primarily play thrash metal. They come from Dallas, Texas. The band started making music in 2008, and their members are lead vocalist, Chad Paramore, lead guitarist, Chance Paramore, bassists, Thomas Kilgore (TK), Guitarist Andy Rhodes, and drummer, Noah Boyce. The band released an extended play, Anthems, in 2010 with Facedown Records alongside Strike First Records. Later joined by Guitarist Phillip Odom Their second extended play, No Shelter, was released in 2013. They are not to be confused with the UK Prog band, "Messenger", whose demo "Solid Chirps" sounds entirely different.

== Background ==
Messengers is a Christian metal band from Dallas, Texas. Their members are lead vocalist, Chad Paramore, lead guitarist, Chance Paramore, bassists, Thomas Kilgore and Andy Rhodes, and drummer, Noah Boyce. Later joined by Guitarist Phillip Odom

== Music history ==
The band commenced as a musical entity in 2008, with their first release, Anthems, an extended play, that was released by Facedown Records alongside Strike First Records on November 9, 2010. Their second extended play, No Shelter, was independently released, in 2013.

== Members ==
Current members

- Chad Paramore – lead vocals
- Chance Paramore – guitar
- Andy Rhodes – guitar

== Discography ==
EPs

- Anthems (November 9, 2010, Facedown/Strike First)
- No Shelter (2013, Independent)
