= Anthem of the Seas =

Quantum-class cruise ship

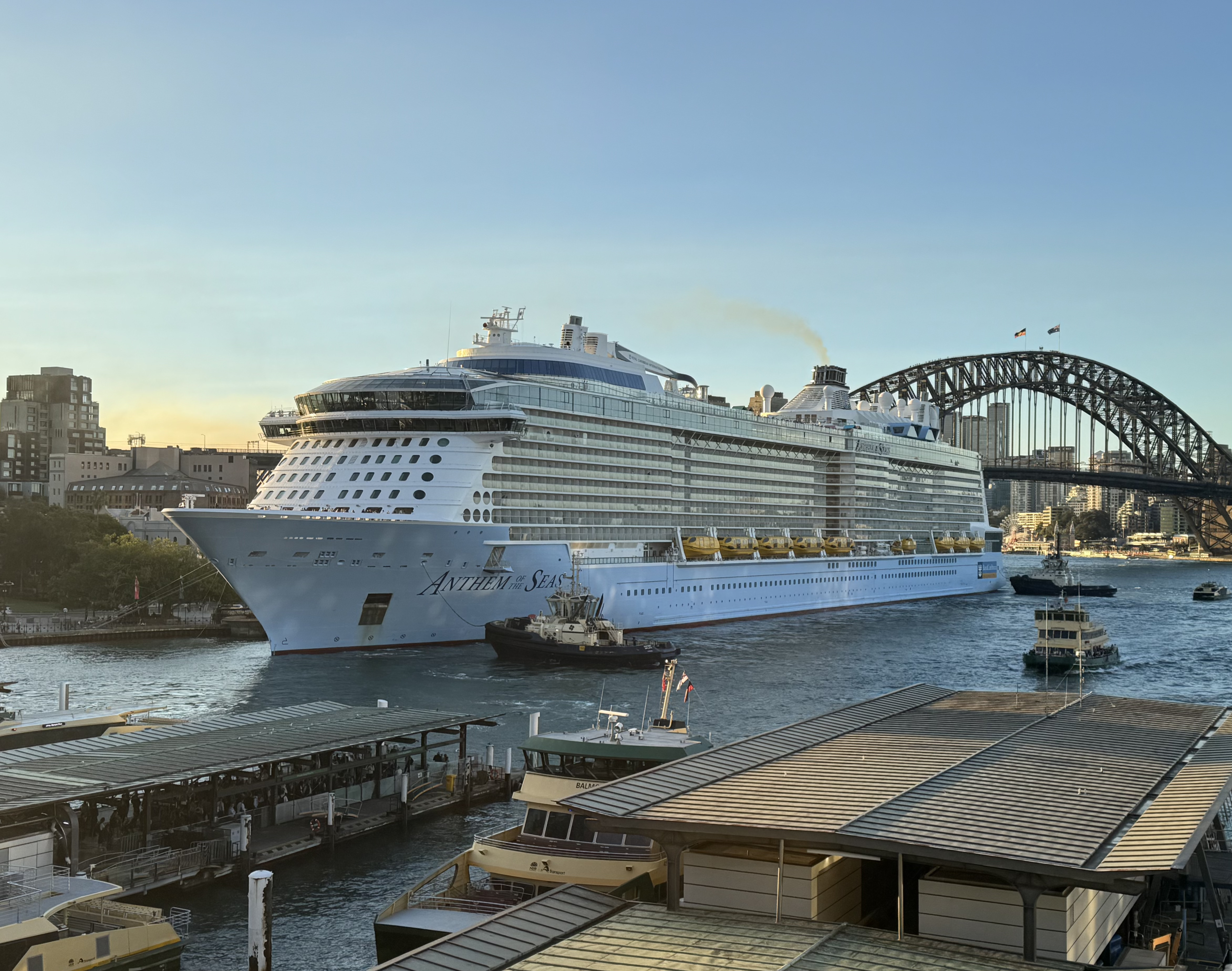
- Anthem of the Seas about to depart Sydney, Australia on 14 April 2026

History

Bahamas
- Name: Anthem of the Seas
- Owner: Royal Caribbean Group
- Operator: Royal Caribbean International
- Port of registry: Nassau, Bahamas
- Ordered: 14 February 2011
- Builder: Meyer Werft, Papenburg, Germany
- Cost: US$940 Million (2015)
- Laid down: 19 November 2013
- Launched: 21 February 2015
- Sponsored by: Emma Wilby
- Christened: 20 April 2015
- Completed: 10 April 2015
- Acquired: 10 April 2015
- Maiden voyage: 22 April 2015
- In service: 2015–present
- Identification: Call sign: C6BI7; IMO number: 9656101; MMSI number: 311000274; DNV ID: 32028
- Status: In service

General characteristics
- Class & type: Quantum-class cruise ship
- Tonnage: 168,666 GT
- Length: 347.06 m (1,138 ft 8 in)
- Beam: 49.4 m (162 ft 1 in) (max); 41.4 m (135 ft 10 in) (waterline)
- Height: 72 m (236 ft 3 in)
- Draught: 8.8 m (28 ft 10 in)
- Decks: 16 (14 passenger-accessible)
- Installed power: 2 × Wärtsilä 12V46F (2 × 14,400 kW); 2 × Wärtsilä 16V46F (2 × 19,200 kW); 2 × Cat 3516C HD (2 × 2,500 kW)
- Propulsion: Diesel-electric; 2 × ABB Azipod XO thrusters (2 × 20.5 MW); 4 × 3,500 kW (4,694 hp) Brunvoll FU115 bow thrusters
- Speed: 22 knots (41 km/h; 25 mph)
- Capacity: 4,180 passengers (double occupancy); 4,905 passengers (maximum occupancy)

Anthem of the Seas is a Quantum-class cruise ship owned by Royal Caribbean International (RCI) and the second ship of her class. The Quantum class is the fourth largest class of cruise ships behind MSC Cruises's Meraviglia class and Royal Caribbean International's Icon class and Oasis class by gross tonnage.

== Concept and construction ==
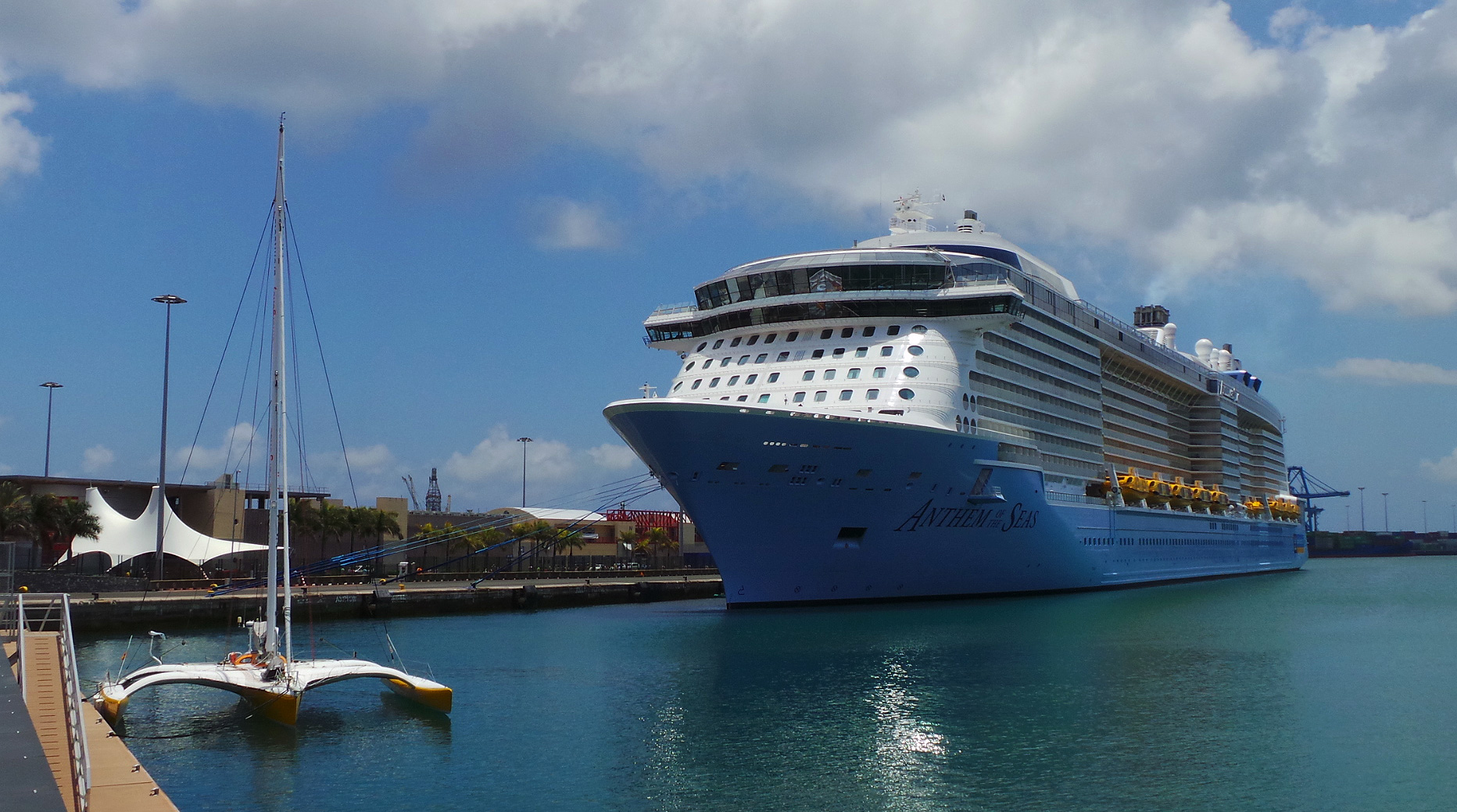
Anthem of the Seas docked at the Santa Catalina cruise terminal in Las Palmas, Canary Islands.

On 11 February 2011, Royal Caribbean announced that they had ordered a new class of ships from the Meyer Werft shipyard in Papenburg, Germany, the first of which was scheduled to be delivered by autumn 2014. At the time, the project was code-named "Project Sunshine". Later that year, two 20.5-megawatt ABB Azipod XO propulsion units were ordered for that ship.

On 29 February 2012 the company announced that a second "Project Sunshine" ship had been ordered and would be delivered by Spring 2015, and ordered identical Azipod propulsion units shortly thereafter. Just under a year later, on 31 January 2013, Royal Caribbean announced the official name of the new class of ships, Quantum Class, as well as the names of the first two ships in the class, Quantum of the Seas and Anthem of the Seas. The keel was laid on 19 November 2013.

== Facilities ==
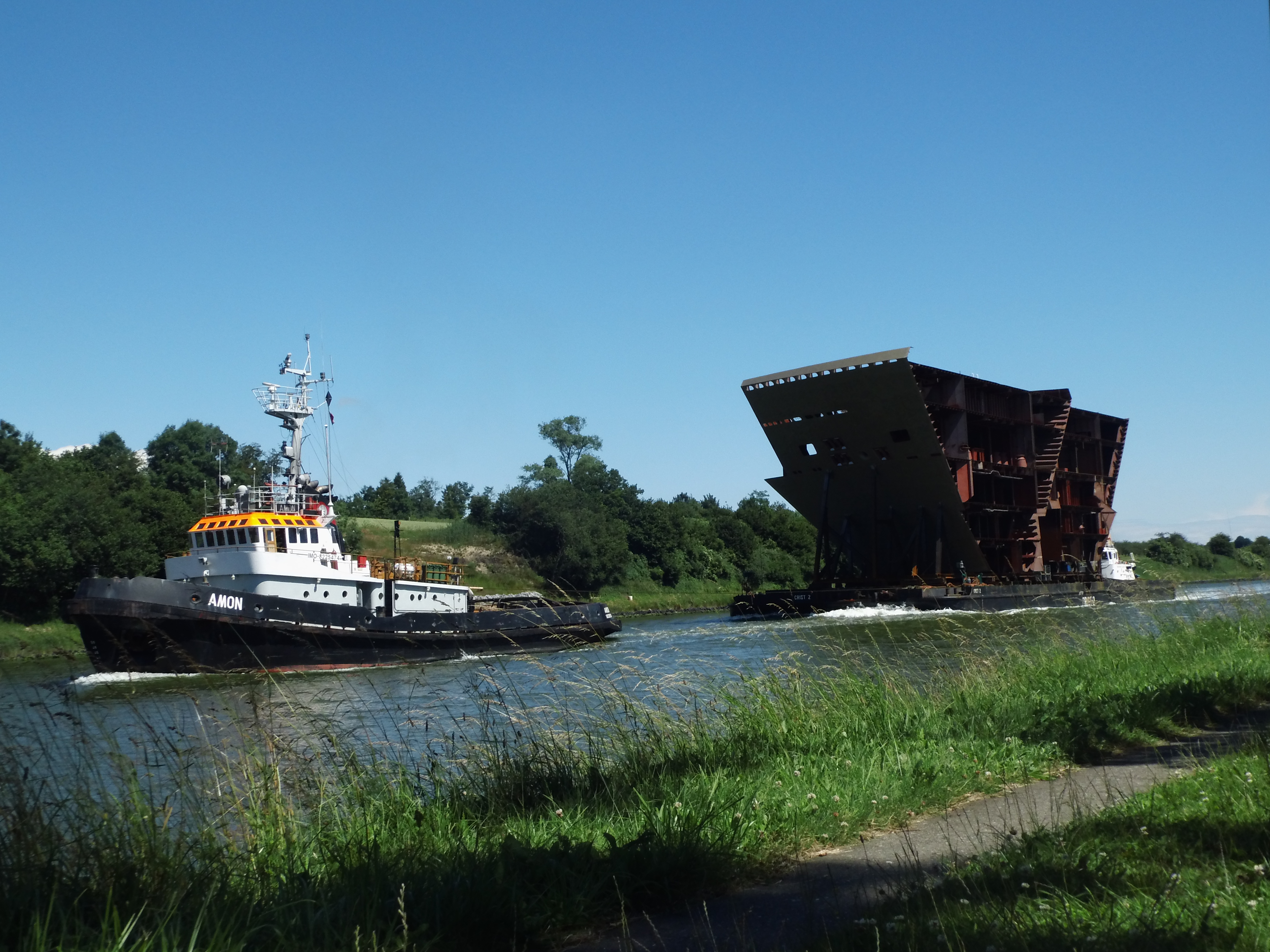
Anthem of the Seas section in Kiel Canal.

Anthem of the Seas has 16 passenger-accessible decks with a total of 2090 passenger cabins. Her facilities include a Wave Loch Flowrider surf simulator, a rock-climbing wall, a skydiving simulator, swimming pools, a solarium, a Spa and Fitness Center, a theater, and a casino.

== Service history ==
Anthem of the Seas was delivered to Royal Caribbean on 10 April 2015. She arrived at her first homeport, Southampton, England, on 15 April 2015, to prepare for her maiden European summer season. At a ceremony held in Southampton on 20 April 2015, she was christened by Emma Wilby, a British travel agent chosen after a search for a travel agent who could sing, and also because she exemplified "grace, beauty, a social conscious (sic) and a sense of adventure". In addition to being a travel agent, Wilby is a military wife who sings in the Military Wives Choir in Kinloss, Scotland.

The christening ceremony took place in the vessel's Royal Theatre in front of 1,300 guests. It began with a procession, followed by performances by the Reading Scottish Pipe Band, and Only Boys Aloud, a boys' choir from Wales. Wilby then sang Katy Perry's hit song "Firework", after which she pushed a button to send a very large bottle of Perrier-Jouët champagne down a zipline on the ship's top deck, from the North Star gondola thrill ride into a wall bearing the ship's name.

On 7 February 2016, the ship was struck by "extreme wind and sea conditions" off Cape Hatteras, North Carolina while sailing south from Bayonne, New Jersey to Port Canaveral, Florida. The ship was caught in 30-foot (9.1 m) waves and a 125 miles per hour (201 km/h) apparent wind. Passengers were advised to stay in their cabins, as the rocking of the ship overturned furniture and caused damage in public areas and cabins, including collapsing part of a suspended ceiling and rendering one of the ship's two azipod propulsion units inoperable. Royal Caribbean reported that only four passengers suffered minor injuries. The ship resumed sailing on 8 February, returning to port in the New York area to avoid further bad weather that had been forecast. Passengers were refunded their full cruise fare, and received a credit for 50% of their fare toward a future cruise within the next year.

On 4 September 2016, Anthem of the Seas was again confronted with stormy conditions generated from the nearby Hurricane Hermine, which was a post-tropical cyclone at the time. The ship experienced gusts of up to 90 mph. Again, passengers were confined to their staterooms to ride out the storm. However, this one caused less damage than the previous incident.

On 7 February 2020, the ship was quarantined due to the coronavirus. A passenger from the 27 January 2020 sailing had traveled through mainland China where the virus was widespread at the time. Royal Caribbean got the test results back from the CDC on 8 February 2020, and the guest tested negative. The ship was cleared to sail on 10 February 2020. All 5,000 passengers due to sail on 7 February sailing had to find their own arrangements for lodging and ended up sailing to Bermuda for four days instead of the Bahamas for eight.
