= Spectrum of the Seas =

Quantum Ultra-class cruise ship

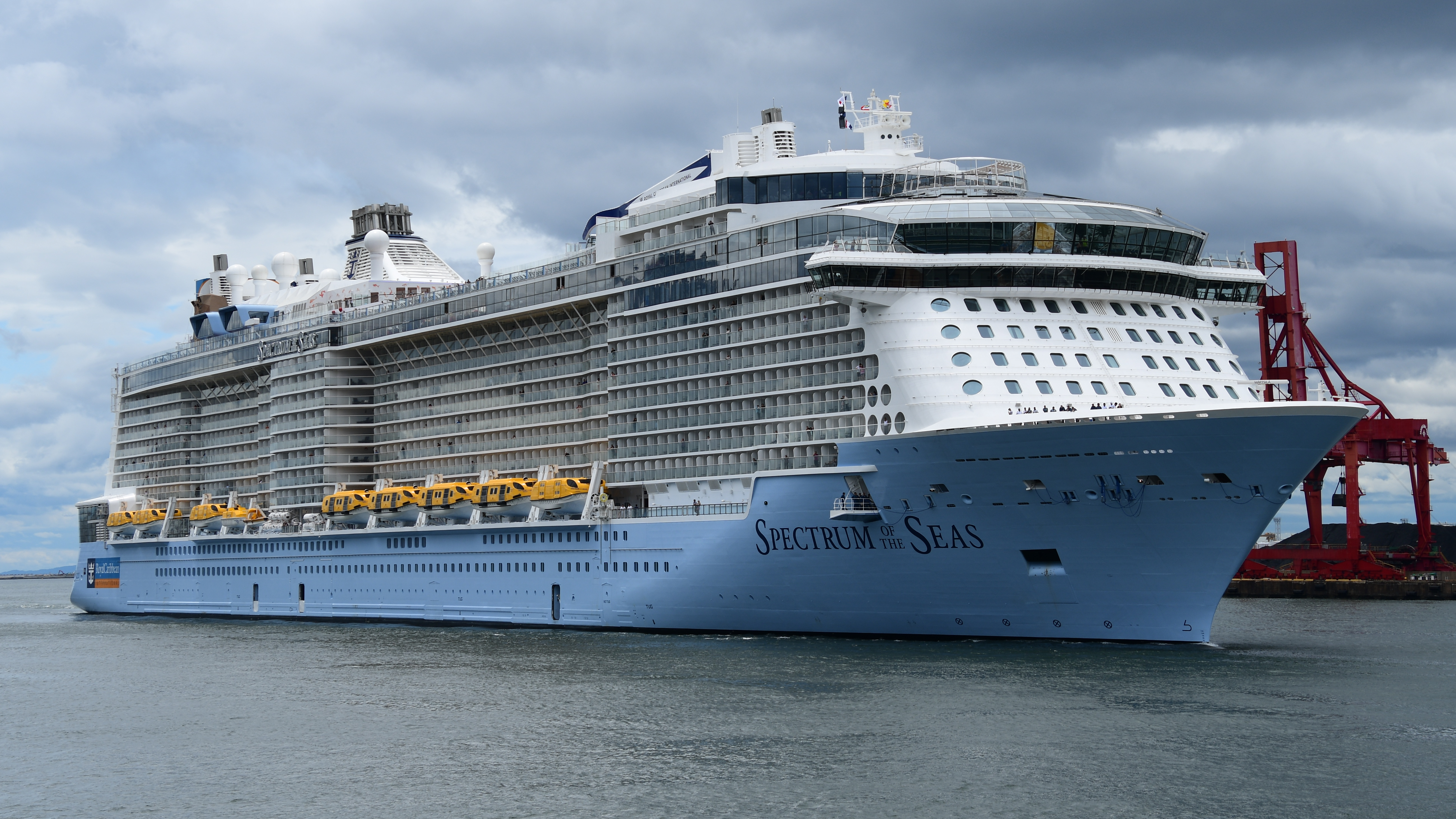
- Spectrum of the Seas in Osaka, 2019

History

Cyprus
- Name: Spectrum of the Seas
- Owner: Royal Caribbean Group
- Operator: Royal Caribbean International
- Port of registry: 2019–2023: Nassau, Bahamas; 2023–present: Limassol, Cyprus
- Ordered: 12 June 2015
- Builder: Meyer Werft, Papenburg, Germany
- Cost: €931 million
- Yard number: S.700
- Laid down: 8 November 2017
- Launched: 25 February 2019
- Christened: 3 June 2019
- Maiden voyage: 18 April 2019
- In service: 2019–present
- Identification: Call sign:C6DQ5; IMO number: 9778856; MMSI number: 311000749; DNV ID: 36874
- Status: In Service

General characteristics
- Class & type: Quantum-Ultra-class cruise ship
- Tonnage: 169,379 GT
- Length: 347.11 m (1,139 ft)
- Beam: 41.2 m (135 ft) (waterline); 49.24 m (162 ft) (max)
- Draught: 8.8 m (29 ft)
- Decks: 16 (14 passenger-accessible)
- Installed power: 2 × Wärtsilä 12V46F (2 × 14,400 kW); 2 × Wärtsilä 16V46F (2 × 19,200 kW); 2 × Cat 3516C HD (2 × 2,500 kW)
- Propulsion: Diesel-electric; 2 × ABB Azipod XO thrusters (2 × 20.5 MW); 4 × 3,500 kW (4,694 hp) Brunvoll FU115 bow thrusters
- Speed: 22 knots (41 km/h; 25 mph)
- Capacity: 4,246 passengers (double occupancy); 4,905 passengers (maximum occupancy)

Spectrum of the Seas is a Quantum-Ultra-class cruise ship operated by Royal Caribbean International and the first ship of the Quantum Ultra class, a modification from the company's Quantum class of ships. The ship was constructed at Meyer Werft in Papenburg, Germany and was delivered in April 2019. At 169,379 GT, she became the fifth largest ship in the fleet by gross tonnage upon delivery. She operates primarily in East Asia.

== History ==
=== Planning ===
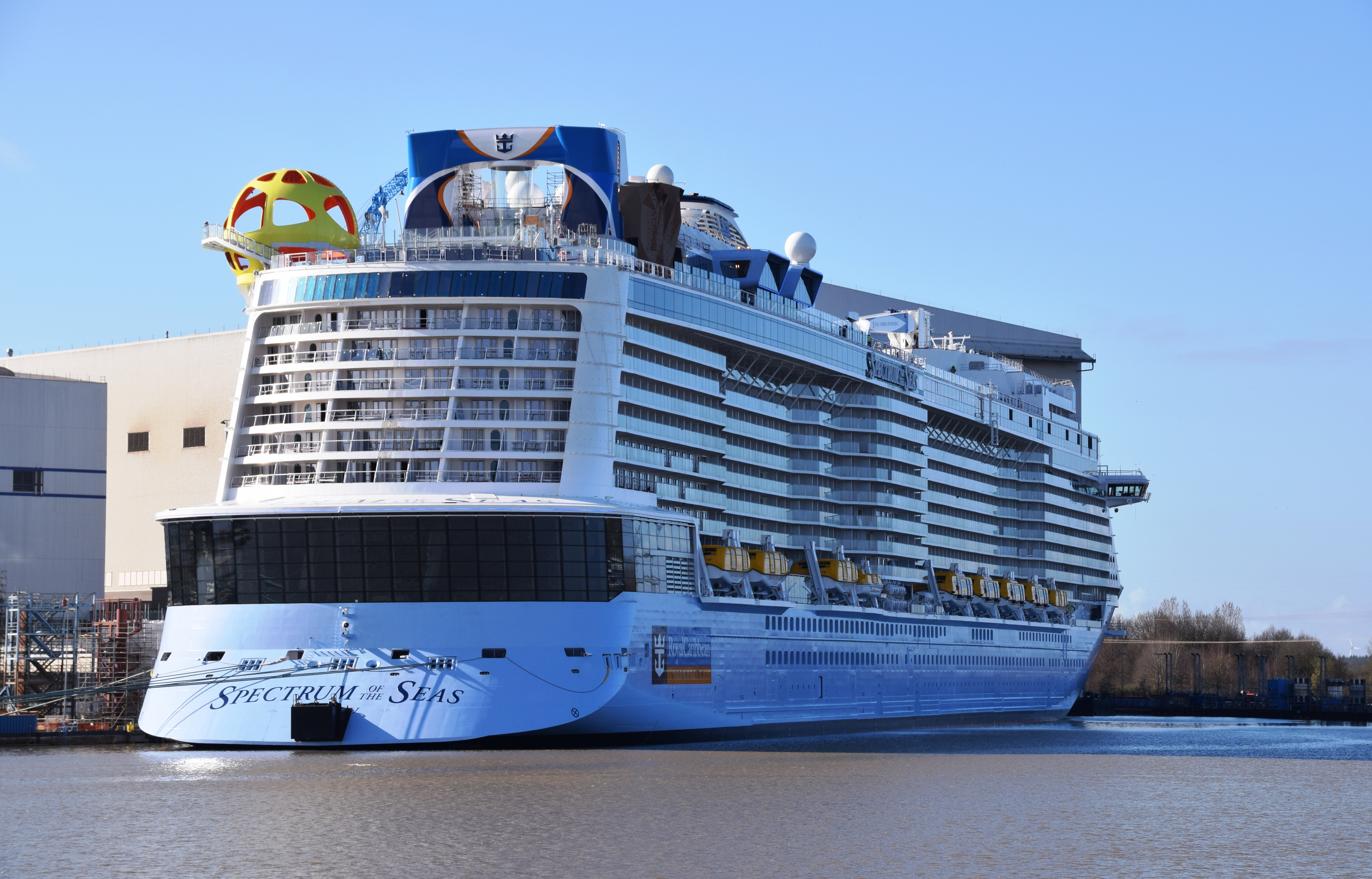
Spectrum of the Seas aft view

On 7 May 2015, Royal Caribbean released an announcement regarding an agreement entered with Meyer Werft about ordering the fourth Quantum-class ship, with a scheduled entry into service of 2019. The name of Royal Caribbean's first Quantum Ultra cruise ship was announced as Spectrum of the Seas on 16 August 2017. On the same day, Michael Bayley, president and CEO of Royal Caribbean, confirmed an announcement made earlier in April 2017 that the ship would be based in the Chinese market and would feature accommodations and offerings specifically designed for the Asia-Pacific region.

=== Construction ===
Construction began with the steel cutting ceremony on 16 August 2017. The keel was laid on 8 November 2017. A coin ceremony was also dedicated on the same day, featuring a coin placed under the first block out of the 74 total blocks comprising the vessel. Spectrum of the Seas floated out from Meyer Werft's shipyard in Papenburg on 25 February 2019, ready to have her funnel cladding installed at the shipyard's outfitting pier. The ship's conveyance up the River Ems for her sea trials in the North Sea began on 20 March 2019 and finished the next day as she arrived in Eemshaven.

=== Delivery and christening ===
Spectrum of the Seas was officially delivered to Royal Caribbean on 11 April 2019 in a ceremony in Bremerhaven. On 3 June 2019, Huang Xiaoming and Angelababy christened the vessel in a ceremony celebrating the ship's arrival in China.

== Service history ==
=== Deployments ===
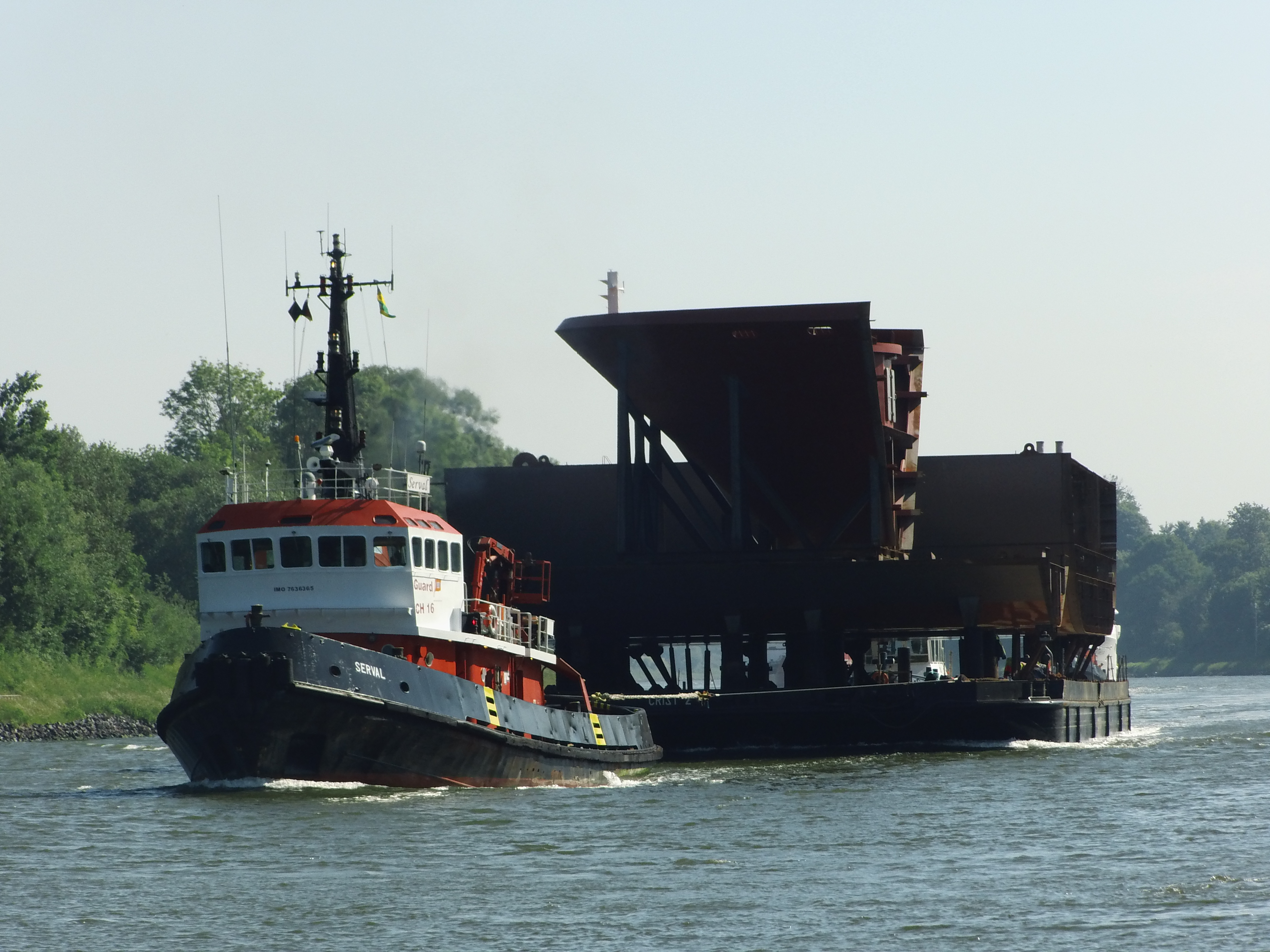
Spectrum of the Seas section in Kiel Canal

On 18 April 2019, Spectrum of the Seas departed on her maiden voyage from Barcelona to Singapore, with two short sailings thereafter before arriving in Shanghai. On the evening of 3 June 2019, following her christening, the ship set sail on her inaugural sailing after her Chinese debut for a three-day cruise around Shanghai. Beginning in June 2019, Spectrum of the Seas has been homeported in Shanghai and cruises between Shanghai and various ports in East Asia.

==== 2020 coronavirus pandemic redeployment ====
Due to the COVID-19 pandemic affecting China, Spectrum of the Seas carrying 1,551 crew members and was temporarily redeployed from Shanghai to Sydney on 14 February 2020 for a series of complimentary cruises for first responders of the 2019–20 Australian bushfire season. This resulted in the cancellation of all cruises scheduled on the ship from Shanghai during the redeployment. The ship was provisioned in Sydney on 3 April and left port without passengers on 4 April in compliance with "Operation Nemesis" of the New South Wales police in response to the pandemic.
