= Anthems (Messengers EP) =

EP by Messengers
- Released: November 9, 2010
- Genres: Christian metal, thrash metal, death metal
- Length: 19:15
- Labels: Facedown, Strike First
- Producer: Daniel Schmuck

Messengers chronology
Anthems (2010)	No Shelter (2013)

Anthems is the first extended play from Messengers. Facedown Records alongside Strike First Records released the EP on November 9, 2010. Messengers worked with Daniel Schmuck, in the production of this album.

== Critical reception ==
Professional ratings
Review scores
Source	Rating
Cross Rhythms	7/10 squares
HM Magazine	2/5 stars
Indie Vision Music	4/5 stars
Jesus Freak Hideout	4/5 stars

Awarding the album two stars from HM Magazine, Matthew Leonard states, "old thrash metal". Christian Cunningham, rating the album a seven out of ten at Cross Rhythms, says, "A fine EP with much to shout about!" Giving the album four stars for Jesus Freak Hideout, Scott Fryberger writes, "Anthems is a well-written EP, and they definitely have potential to improve with time." BMer, awarding the album four stars by Indie Vision Music, describes, "Anthems is going back to the roots of spirit-filled hardcore, potentially filling the void that longtime hardcore fans have been hoping to fill."

== Track listing ==
All tracks are written by Messengers

No.	Title	Length
1.	"Shipwreck"	2:53
2.	"Creation"	2:40
3.	"Domicile"	3:26
4.	"Weight"	1:51
5.	"Judge"	2:57
6.	"Palerose"	1:58
7.	"Anthems"	3:30
Total length:		19:15
