= The Building of the House =

Overture by Benjamin Britten

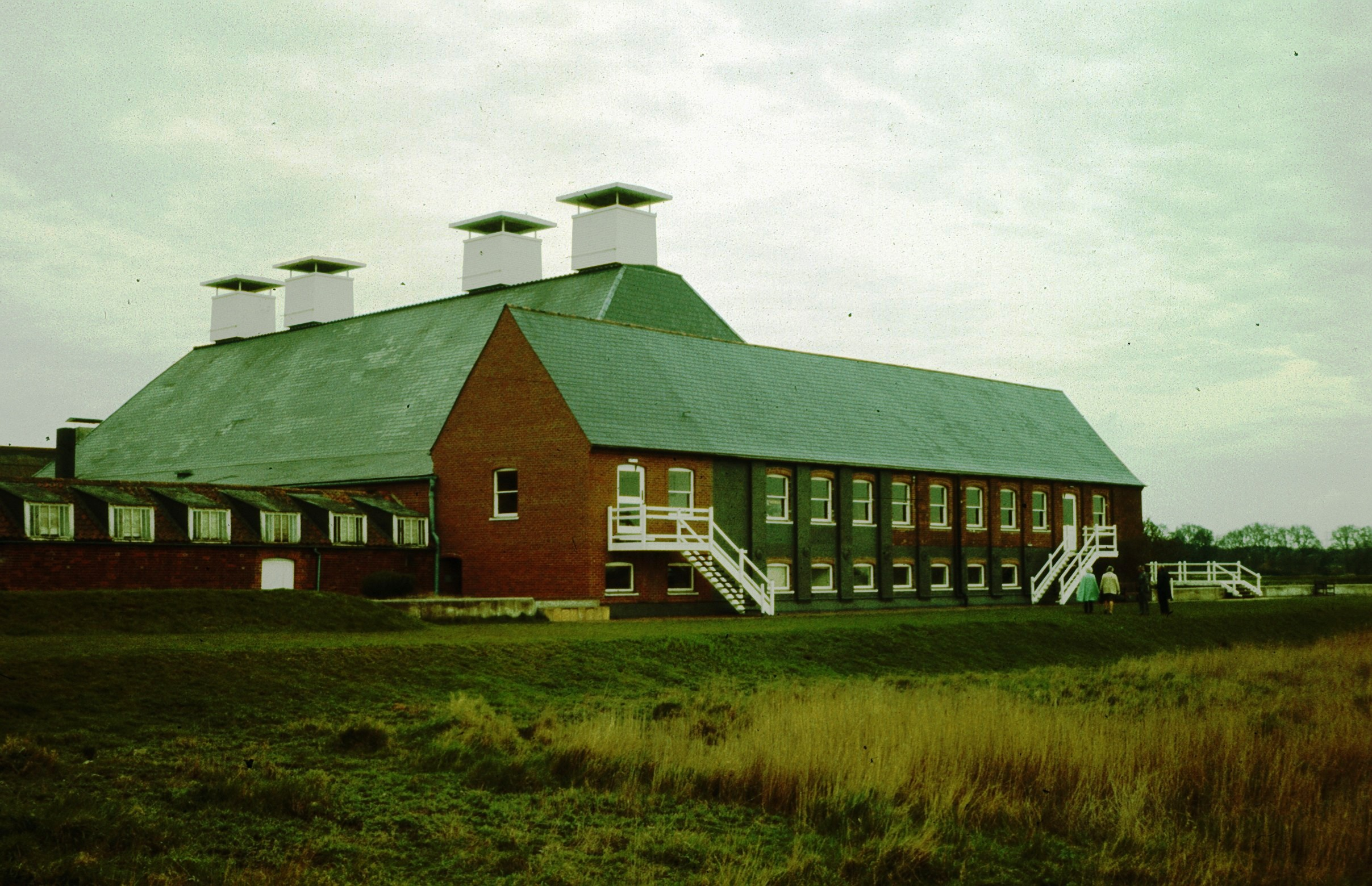
Snape Maltings concert hall in 1975

The Building of the House, op. 79 is an "overture with or without chorus" by Benjamin Britten written in 1967. The overture is notable for the use of Asian-influenced heterophony.

== Text ==
The optional text is taken from Psalm 127, adapted by Imogen Holst from The Whole Book of Psalms (set in English). It is set using the chorale melody "Vater unser im Himmelreich". In performance the chorale can be sung by a choir or played on the organ.

== History ==
The piece was written for the inauguration of the Snape Maltings concert hall, which took place in June 1967. This has been described as the first performance, although it was played at the opening of the Queen Elizabeth Hall in London which took place earlier the same year. Constantin Silvestri introduced the work to Bournemouth, conducting the BSO in a performance on November 23, 1967.

=== Notable performances since 1967 ===
This piece was played at the United Nations General Assembly on 24 October 1969, by the Royal Philharmonic Orchestra conducted by Rudolf Kempe. The concert commemorated the 25th anniversary of United Nations Day.

The Building of the House, which had not been played in the Snape Maltings Concert Hall since the 1987 Aldeburgh Festival, was again performed there for the 2017 Aldeburgh Festival of Music and the Arts, marking the fiftieth anniversary of the composition.

The piece was played in 2018 by Chineke!, a BME orchestra in residence at the South Bank, in a concert to mark the reopening of the Queen Elizabeth Hall after refurbishment.

== Recordings ==
The piece has been recorded by the City of Birmingham Symphony Orchestra under the baton of Sir Simon Rattle.
