= Timeline of largest passenger ships =

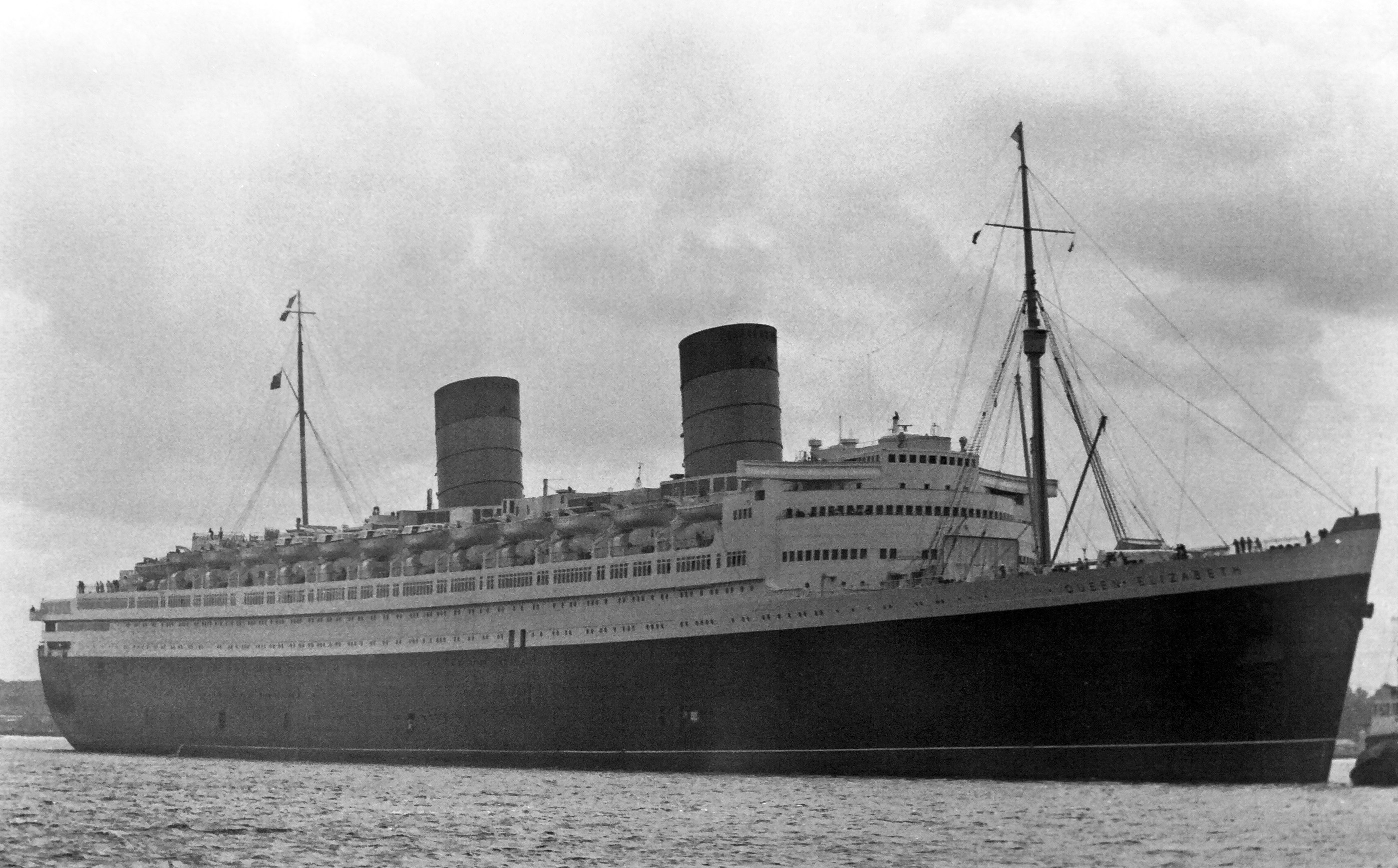
RMS Queen Elizabeth's size record stood for the longest time at over 54 years

This is a timeline of the world's largest passenger ships based upon internal volume, initially measured by gross register tonnage and later by gross tonnage. This timeline reflects the largest extant passenger ship in the world at any given time. If a given ship was superseded by another, scrapped, or lost at sea, it is then succeeded. Some records for tonnage outlived the ships that set them - notably the SS Great Eastern, and RMS Queen Elizabeth. The term "largest passenger ship" has evolved over time to also include ships by length as supertankers built by the 1970s were over 400 metres (1,300 ft) long. In the modern era "largest passenger ship" has gradually fallen out of use in favor of "largest cruise ship" as the industry has shifted to cruising rather than transatlantic ocean travel. While some of these modern cruise ships were later expanded, they did not regain their "largest" titles.

== Timeline ==
Year completed	Ship	Tonnage	Length	Title held	Status	Image
=== 19th century === 19th century
1831	SS Royal William	1,370 GRT	49 m (160 ft)	1831 – 1839	Sank in 1860	
1838	SS Great Western	1,700 GRT	76.8 m (252 ft)	1839	Scrapped in 1856	
1839	SS British Queen	1,850 GRT	75 m (245 ft)	1839 – 1840; 1841 – 1843	Scrapped in 1844	
1840	SS President	2,366 GRT	74 m (243 ft)	1840 – 1841	Lost at sea in 1841	
1843 (Note: Sources have the Great Britain as the "world's largest" ship from her launch year.)	SS Great Britain	3,270 GRT	98 m (322 ft)	1843 – 1853	Currently a Museum ship	
1853	SS Atrato	3,466 GRT	107 m (350 ft)	1853 – 1857 (Note: While the Great Republic was concurrently larger (at 4,555 GRT), she was not a passenger ship.)	Sank in 1884	
1857	SS Adriatic	3,670 GRT	108 m (354 ft)	1857 — 1858	Beached and Abandoned in 1885	
1858	SS Great Eastern	18,915 GRT (not exceeded until RMS Celtic, 1901)	211 m (692 ft)	1858 – c. 1888 (Scrapped)	Scrapped by 1891 (Note: Great Eastern was sold for scrap in 1888 but the breaking up was not completed until 1891.)	
1888	SS City of New York	10,499 GRT	171 m (560 ft)	c. 1888 – 1893	Scrapped in 1923	
22 April 1893 (entered service)	RMS Campania (Note: The Campania and Lucania had the same GRT.)	12,950 GRT	190 m (622 ft)	1893 – 1897 (Note: The Campania and Lucania shared the "largest passenger ship" record until 1897.)	Sank in 1918	
2 September 1893 (entered service)	RMS Lucania (Note: The Campania and Lucania had the same GRT.)	12,950 GRT	190 m (622 ft)	1893 – 1897	Scrapped in 1909	
1897	SS Kaiser Wilhelm der Grosse	14,349 GRT	200 m (655 ft)	1897 – 1899	Sank in 1914	
1899	RMS Oceanic	17,272 GRT	215 m (704 ft)	1899 – 1901	Sank in 1914	
=== 20th century === 20th century
11 July 1901	RMS Celtic	20,904 GRT	214 m (701 ft)	1901 – 1903	Ran aground in 1928, Scrapped on site in 1929	
31 January 1903	RMS Cedric	21,073 GRT	213 m (700 ft)	1903 – 1904	Scrapped in 1932	
23 June 1904	RMS Baltic	23,876 GRT	222 m (729 ft)	1904 – 1906	Scrapped in 1933	
10 May 1906 (entered service)	SS Kaiserin Auguste Victoria	24,581 GRT	206.5 m (677.5 ft)	1906 – 1907	Scrapped in 1930	
7 September 1907 (entered service)	RMS Lusitania	31,550 GRT	240 m (787 ft)	1907	Sank in 1915	
7 November 1907	RMS Mauretania	31,938 GRT	241 m (790 ft)	1907 – 1911	Scrapped in 1935	
31 May 1911	RMS Olympic	45,324 GRT (as built); 46,439 GRT (1913 size)	269.0 m (882.5 ft)	1911 – 1912; 1912 – 1913	Scrapped by 1937	
31 March 1912	RMS Titanic	46,328 GRT	269.1 m (882.9 ft)	1912 (Sank)	Sank in 1912	
June 1913	SS Imperator	52,117 GRT	276 m (906 ft)	1913 – 1914	Scrapped in 1938	
14 May 1914 (entered service)	SS Vaterland	54,282 GRT	290 m (950 ft)	1914 – 1922	Scrapped in 1938	
12 May 1922 (entered service)	RMS Majestic	56,551 GRT	291 m (956 ft)	1922 – 1935	Scrapped in 1943 (after sinking)	
29 May 1935 (entered service)	SS Normandie	79,280 GRT (as built); 83,404 GRT (final size)	314 m (1,029 ft)	1935 – 1942 (Destroyed by fire)	Scrapped in 1946 (after sinking)	
2 March 1940 (Note: Although Queen Elizabeth was completed on 2 March 1940 as an ocean liner, she was converted into a troop ship due to the outbreak of World War II. She became the largest ship in the world in 1942 when SS Normandie burned and sank at her moorings. Transatlantic service was not resumed until after the war ended, and Queen Elizabeth officially entered into passenger service on 16 October 1946.)	RMS Queen Elizabeth	83,673 GRT (not exceeded until Carnival Destiny, 1996)	314 m (1,031 ft)	1942 – 1972 (Destroyed by fire)	Scrapped in 1974 (after sinking)	
3 February 1962 (entered service)	SS France (1962-1980); SS Norway (post-1980)	66,343 GRT (as built); 76,049 GRT (final size) (Note: SS France increased her tonnage in 1980, when she was refurbished into a cruise ship. Her final size peaked at 76,049 GRT in 1990. She was the last ship on this list to be measured by "GRT", as the term was changed to "GT" on 18 July 1994.)	315 m (1,035 ft)	1972 – 1987; 1990 – 1995	Scrapped in 2008	
18 December 1987	MS Sovereign of the Seas	73,529 GT	268 m (880 ft)	1987 – 1990 (Surpassed by SS Norway)	Scrapped in 2020	
26 June 1995	Sun Princess	77,000 GT	261 m (857 ft)	1995 – 1996	In service as Pacific World	
24 November 1996 (entered service)	Carnival Destiny	101,353 GT	272 m (893 ft)	1996 – 1998	In service as Carnival Sunshine	
27 May 1998 (entered service)	Grand Princess	109,000 GT	290 m (951 ft)	1998 – 1999	In service	
29 October 1999	Voyager of the Seas	137,276 GT	311 m (1,020 ft)	1999 – 2000	In service	
28 September 2000	Explorer of the Seas	137,308 GT	311 m (1,020 ft)	2000 – 2002	In service	
=== 21st century === 21st century
18 November 2002	Navigator of the Seas	138,279 GT (as built)	311 m (1,020 ft)	2002 – 2003	In service	
22 December 2003	RMS Queen Mary 2	148,528 GT (as built)	345.03 m (1,132.0 ft)	2003 – 2006	In service	
24 April 2006	MS Freedom of the Seas	154,407 GT (as built)	338.774 m (1,111.46 ft)	2006 – 2009 (Note: Freedom of the Seas was initially launched at 154,407 GT. This was tied by its sister ships Liberty of the Seas in 2007 and Independence of the Seas in 2008, and all three vessels shared the "largest passenger ship" record until 2009, although the latter were 15 cm (5.9 in) and 14 cm (5.5 in) longer, respectively.)	In service	
18 May 2007	Liberty of the Seas	154,407 GT (as built)	338.92 m (1,111.9 ft)	2007 – 2009	In service	
30 April 2008	Independence of the Seas	154,407 GT (as built)	338.91 m (1,111.9 ft)	2008 – 2009	In service	
28 October 2009	Oasis of the Seas	225,282 GT (as built)	360 m (1,180 ft)	2009 – 2016 (Note: Oasis was initially launched at 225,282 GT. This was tied a year later by Allure of the Seas, and both vessels shared the "largest passenger ship" record until 2016, although the latter was 50 mm (2.0 in) longer. Oasis of the Seas was later expanded to 226,838 GT.)	In service	
28 October 2010	Allure of the Seas	225,282 GT (as built)	360 m (1,180 ft)	2010 – 2016	In service	
13 May 2016	Harmony of the Seas	226,963 GT	362.12 m (1,188.1 ft)	2016 – 2018	In service	
23 March 2018	Symphony of the Seas	228,081 GT	361.011 m (1,184.42 ft)	2018 – 2022	In service	SymphonyOfTheSeas (cropped) 02
27 January 2022	Wonder of the Seas	235,600 GT	362.04 m (1,187.8 ft)	2022 – 2023	In service	
27 November 2023	Icon of the Seas	248,663 GT	364.75 m (1,196.7 ft)	2023 – present (Note: Icon of the Seas, Star of the Seas and Legend of the Seas concurrently share the "largest passenger ship" record.)	In service	
10 July 2025	Star of the Seas	248,663 GT	364.83 m (1,196.9 ft)	2024 – present	In service	
10 June 2026	Legend of the Seas	248,663 GT	364.84 m (1,197.0 ft)	2026 – present	In service	

== See also ==
- List of largest ships by gross tonnage
- List of longest wooden ships
- List of large sailing vessels
- List of ocean liners
