= Liberty of the Seas =

Freedom-class cruise ship

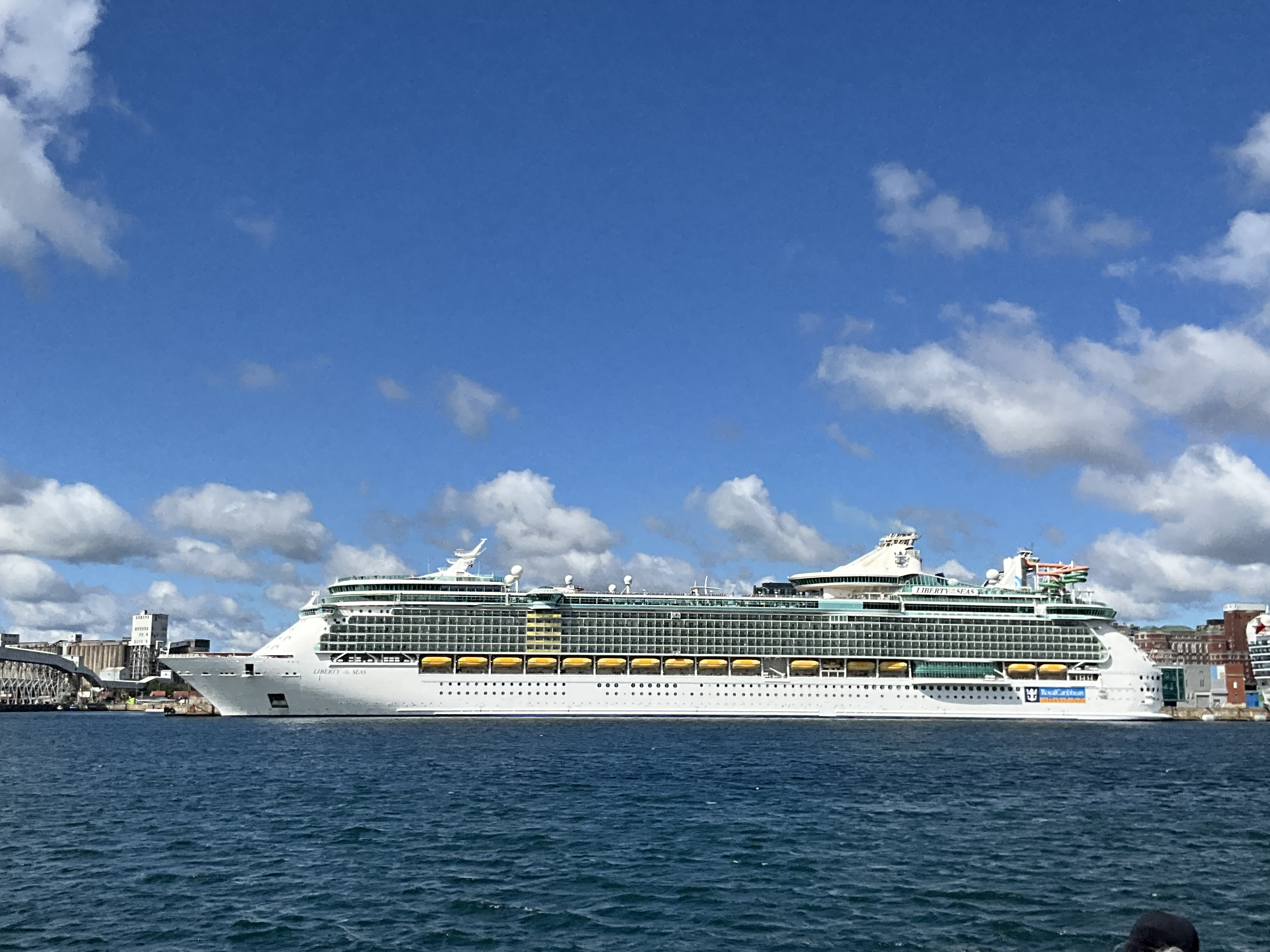
- Liberty of the Seas docked in Halifax, Nova Scotia, Canada on August 18, 2025

History

Bahamas
- Name: Liberty of the Seas
- Owner: Royal Caribbean Group
- Operator: Royal Caribbean International
- Port of registry: Nassau, Bahamas
- Route: Caribbean; Mediterranean
- Builder: Aker Yards Turku Shipyard, Finland
- Cost: US$800 million
- Launched: May 2007
- Christened: May 18, 2007 by Donnalea Madeley
- Completed: 2007
- Maiden voyage: May 19, 2007
- In service: 2007–present
- Refit: Late April 2026
- Home port: Fort Lauderdale, Florida (until 2026); Galveston, Texas (From October 31, 2026); Cape Liberty (Bayonne), New Jersey; Southampton, England, United Kingdom
- Identification: Call sign: C6VQ8; IMO number: 9330032; MMSI number: 309436000; DNV ID: 26180
- Status: In service

General characteristics
- Class & type: Freedom-class cruise ship
- Tonnage: 155,889 GT
- Length: 338.92 m (1,111.94 ft)
- Beam: 38.618 m (126.70 ft) (waterline); 56.08 m (183.99 ft) (max)
- Height: 63.70 m (209 ft)
- Draught: 9.026 m (29.61 ft)
- Decks: 18 total decks, 15 passenger decks
- Installed power: 6 × Wärtsilä 12V46 (6 × 12,600 kW)); 2 × Cat 3516B (2 × 2,500 kW)
- Propulsion: Diesel-electric; 2 × ABB Azipod V21; 1 × ABB Fixipod; 4 × Ulstein tunnel thrusters
- Speed: 21.6 knots (40.0 km/h; 24.9 mph)
- Capacity: 3,798 (double occupancy); 4,960 (maximum occupancy)
- Crew: 1,300 (average)

Liberty of the Seas is a Royal Caribbean International Freedom-class cruise ship which entered regular service in May 2007. It was initially announced that she would be called Endeavour of the Seas; however, this name was later changed. The 15-deck ship accommodates 3,634 passengers served by 1,360 crew. She was built in 18 months at the Aker Finnyards Turku Shipyard, Finland, where her sister ship, Freedom of the Seas, was also built. Initially built at 154,407 gross tonnage (GT), she joined her sister ship, Freedom of the Seas, as the largest cruise ships and passenger vessels then ever built. She is 1,111.9 ft (338.91 m) long, 184 ft (56.08 m) wide, and cruises at 21.6 knots (40 km/h).

Liberty of the Seas is the second of the Freedom-class vessels. A third ship, Independence of the Seas, was delivered in April 2008. In 2009, the first in a new Oasis class of ships measuring 220,000 gross tons displaced the Freedom class as the world's largest passenger ships.

The ship has the capability to "cold iron" meaning whilst at a port with a suitable connection, it can plug into the local power system and then turn off it engines.

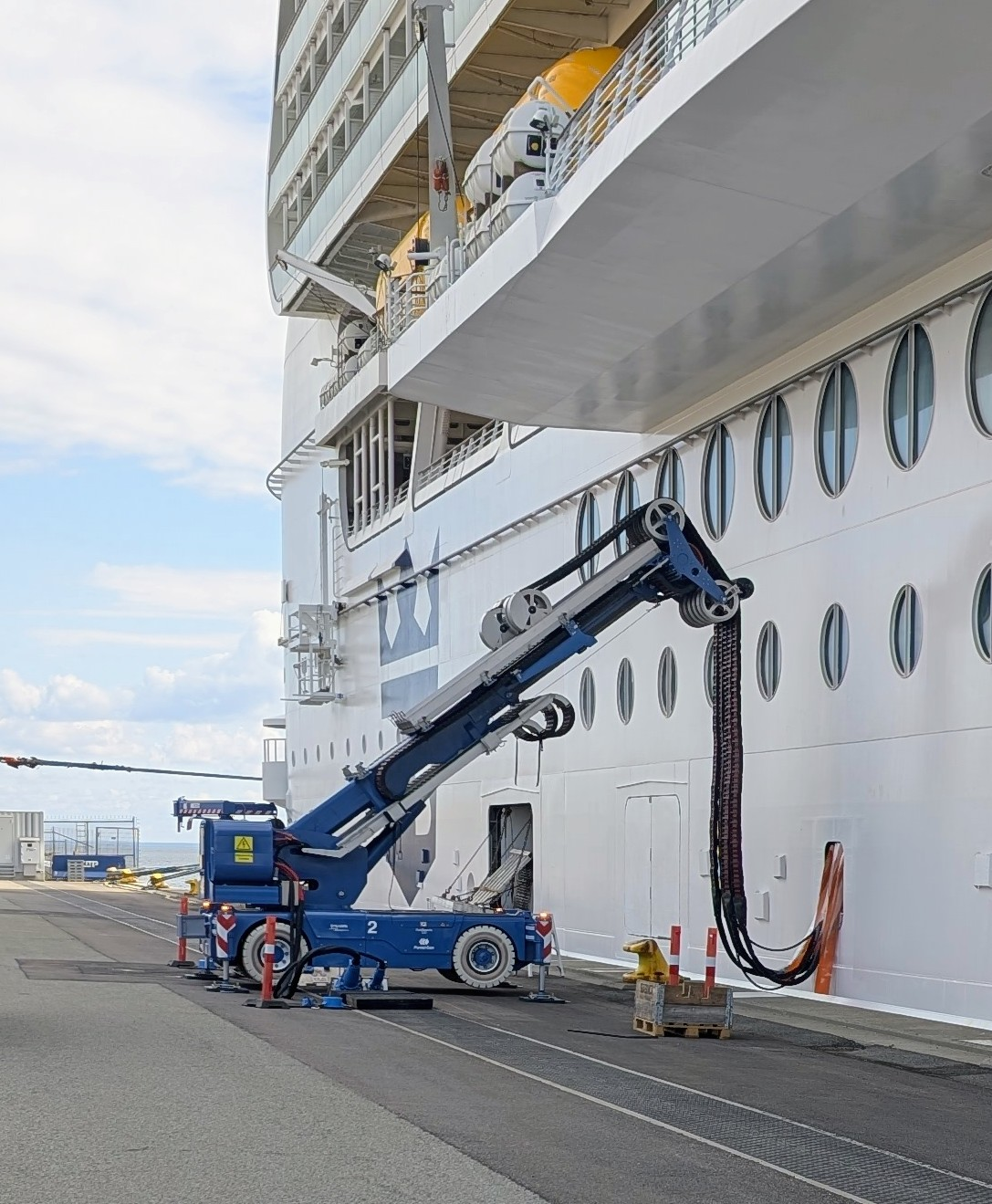
Liberty of the Seas cold-ironing (plugged-in so it can turn off engines) in Copenhagen

== History ==
On April 19, 2007, Liberty of the Seas was delivered to parent company Royal Caribbean Cruises Ltd. On April 22, 2007, she made her first port of call Southampton, on a promotional visit. She arrived at Cape Liberty Cruise Port on May 3, 2007.

On May 18, 2007, the ship was christened by Toronto-based travel agent Donnalea Madeley, who, along with her husband, is also the founder of the charity Hands Across the Nations.

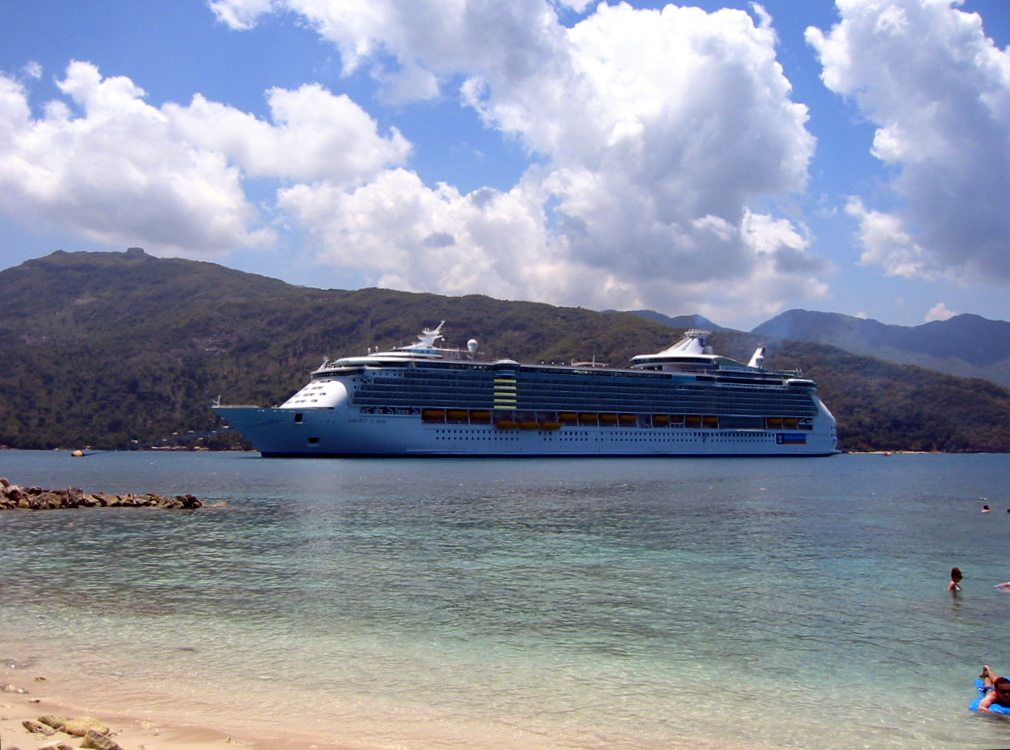
Liberty of the Seas docked in Labadee, Haiti on April 21, 2008

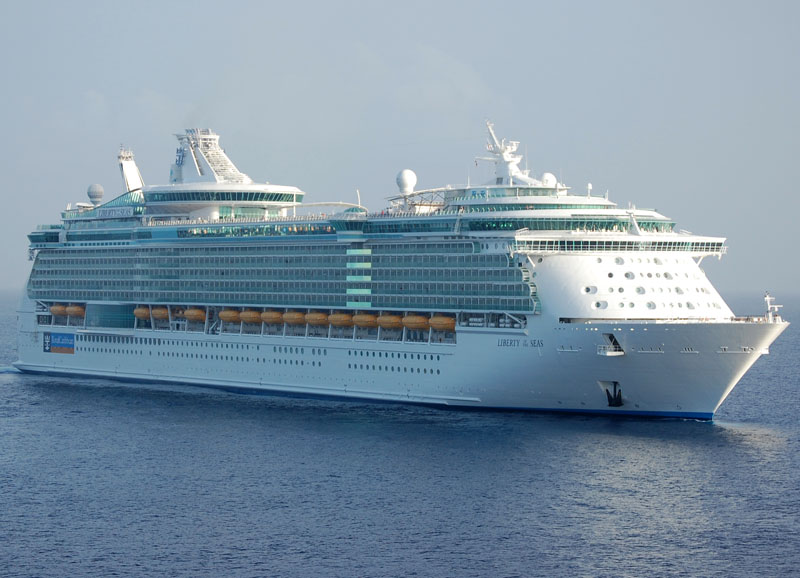
Liberty of the Seas is anchored off and departs George Town, Grand Cayman on June 18, 2008

In January 2011, Liberty of the Seas underwent renovations which included an outdoor video screen in the main pool area.

Later in 2011, Liberty of the Seas completed her first transatlantic repositioning cruise, moving from Miami, Florida to being home-ported in Barcelona, Spain. She stayed in Europe for the summer and part of fall, and then returned to Miami. Until 2015, Liberty of the Seas spent summers in Europe and winters in either Port of Miami or Port Everglades in Florida. In 2015, Liberty of the Seas repositioned to Cape Liberty Cruise Port in Bayonne, New Jersey from May to November, after which she repositioned to Galveston, Texas.

In February 2016, Liberty of the Seas again underwent renovations, adding additional cabins atop the front of the ship, introducing new restaurants, and making enhancements to the pool deck. After the enhancements, Liberty of the Seas was 155,889 gross tonnage (GT), making her larger than the other two Freedom-class ships, and the eleventh largest cruise ship in the world, beating Norwegian Epic by 16 GT.

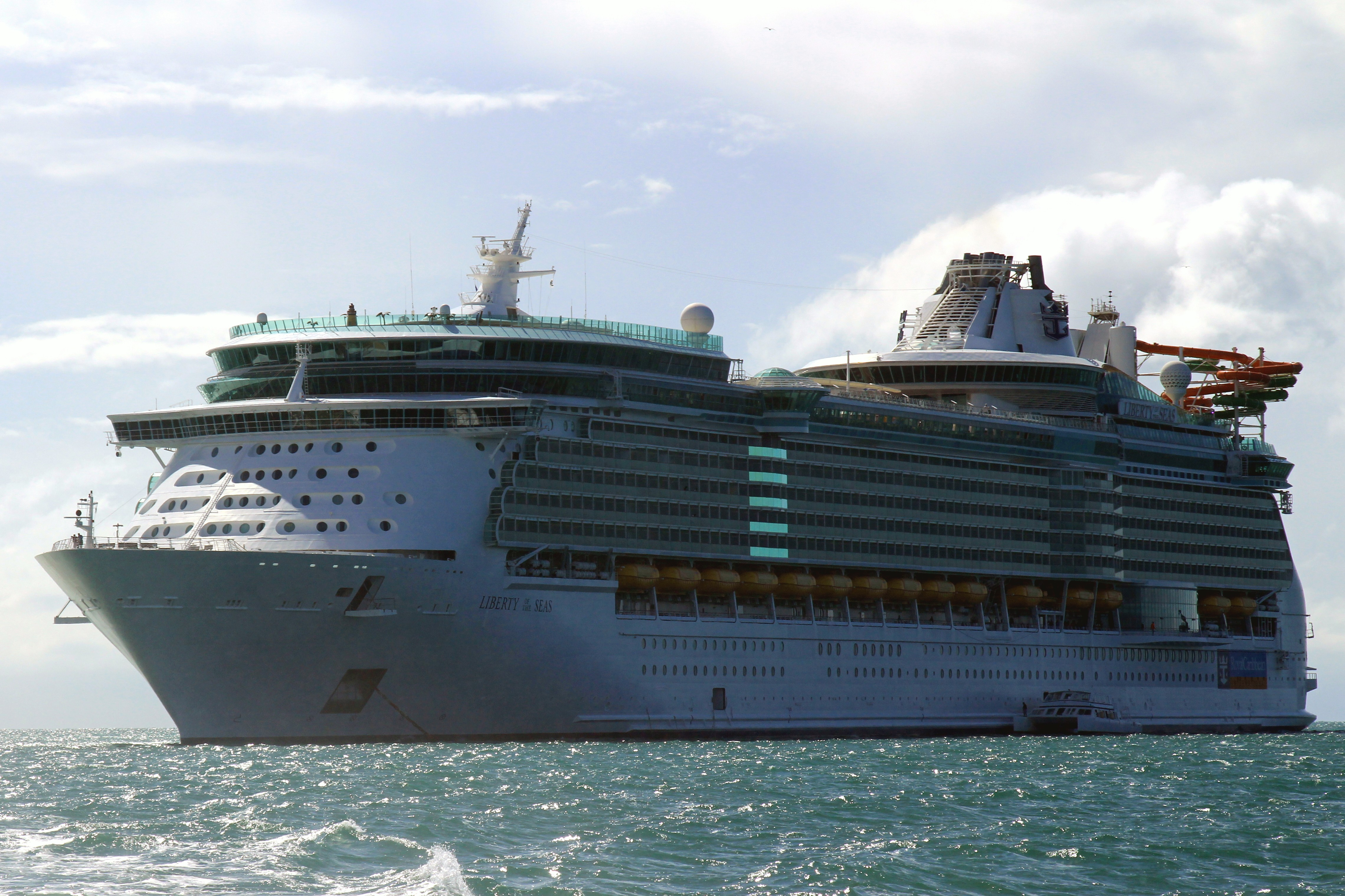
Liberty of the Seas docked in Belize City on October 27, 2016

In late April 2026, Liberty of the Seas underwent another major renovation, this time adding The Lime & Coconut bar, an escape room, Izumi Teppanyaki, El Loco Fresh, Starbucks, and more cabins to the ship.

== Incidents ==
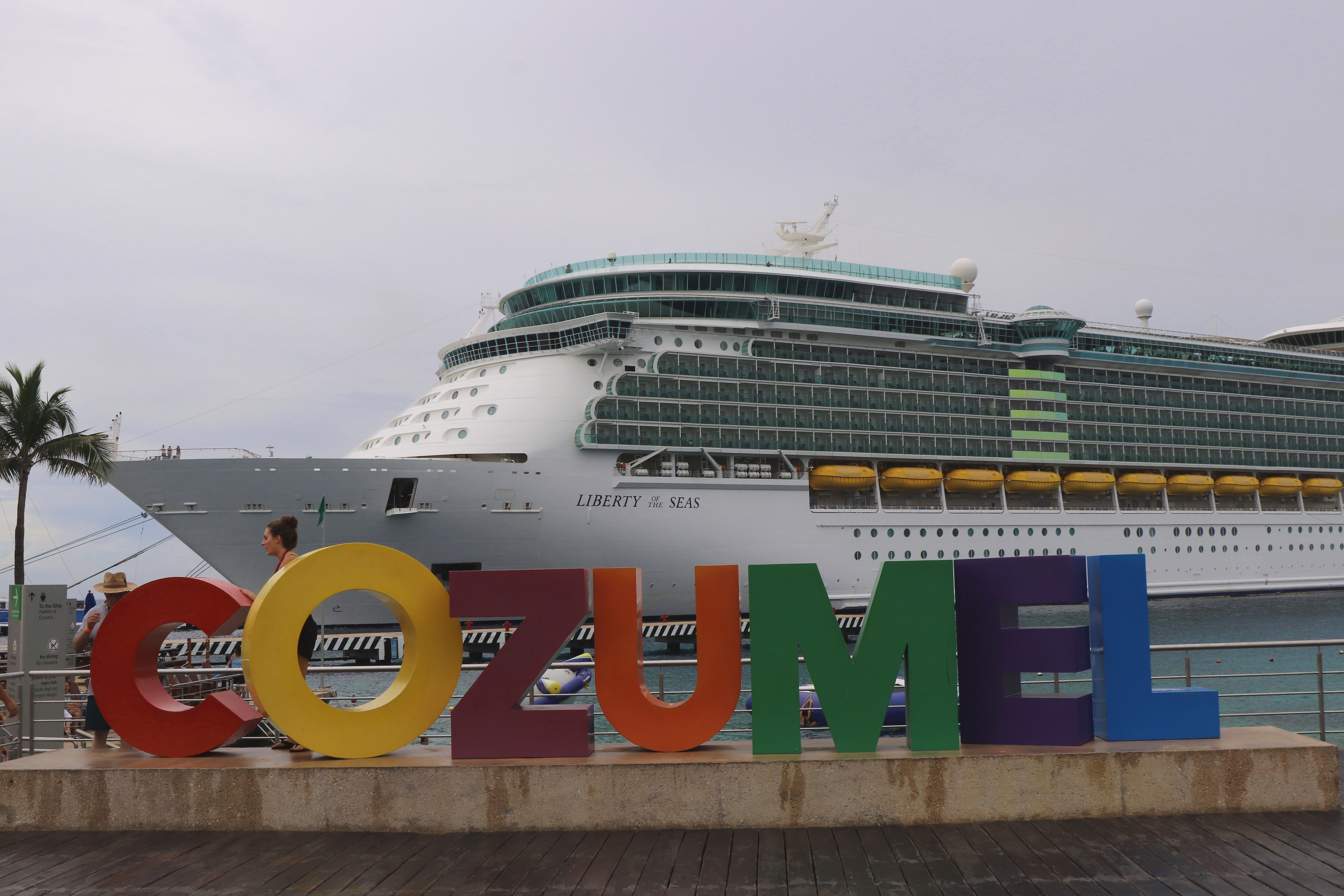
Liberty of the Seas docked in Cozumel, Mexico on October 22, 2019

On April 2, 2020, it was reported that two crew members had tested positive for coronavirus. One was asymptomatic, and remained in quarantine on board the ship, while the other, who showed visible symptoms, disembarked and was sent to a hospital in Galveston. On April 15, 2020, after the ship was anchored on the coast of Texas, it returned and docked in Galveston.

On April 4, 2024, a 20-year-old man went overboard the ship. After an extensive search effort by the US Coast Guard and the ship's crew, he was declared missing.

== Facilities ==
Liberty of the Seas has extensive sports facilities including the FlowRider onboard wave generator for surfing, an interactive water play area for children, a full-sized volleyball / basketball court, an ice skating rink, and a large fitness center. There are also two whirlpools that are cantilevered and project out from the sides of the ship to provide unimpeded views of the sea below and a modular conference center for business meetings. Among other dining facilities there is a three level formal dining room.

A refurbishment in 2016 added a water slide complex, featuring two racing slides and a boomerang-style slide, and a children-only water play area, featuring smaller water slides.

Many of the ship's interiors were extensively decorated by muralist Clarissa Parish.
