= Clarissa Parish =

Anglo-Italian muralist

Clarissa Parish is an Anglo-Italian muralist who has painted numerous murals and decorative works for cruise ships, private residences and hotels. Her work includes murals and trompe l'oeil effects on many cruise ships, including the Liberty of the Seas, the Independence of the Seas, and the Oasis of the Seas. She has also done extensive work for private clients and hotels, and the Hurlingham Club in London. Parish continues to paint for the cruise ship industry. She has worked on 17 ships for Royal Caribbean including the Allure and Oasis of the Seas (two of the world's biggest cruise ships) where she and her team decorated numerous areas of the ships with large murals. They have also worked for Norwegian Cruise Lines and Cunard.

Parish began painting murals at age 16, inspired by the work of her grandmother who she describes as "a brilliant painter". She studied art at Chelsea School of Art and then in Florence for six months learning the art of trompe l'oeil, where she "learned colour techniques", and "acquired my own palette".

In 1989, she painted a mural with the artist Rupert Till, decorating the construction work at 4 Millbank during its redevelopment by the Swedish developers Nisses Millbank. Parish was the winner of a competition to select the best design for the 160 foot mural which faced the Houses of Parliament and was unveiled by Lord St John of Fawsley on 13 July 1989. In January 1990, she was given an Evening Standard Environment Award by the editor John Leese for her work on the mural.
