= Freedom-class cruise ship =

Group of Royal Caribbean cruise ships

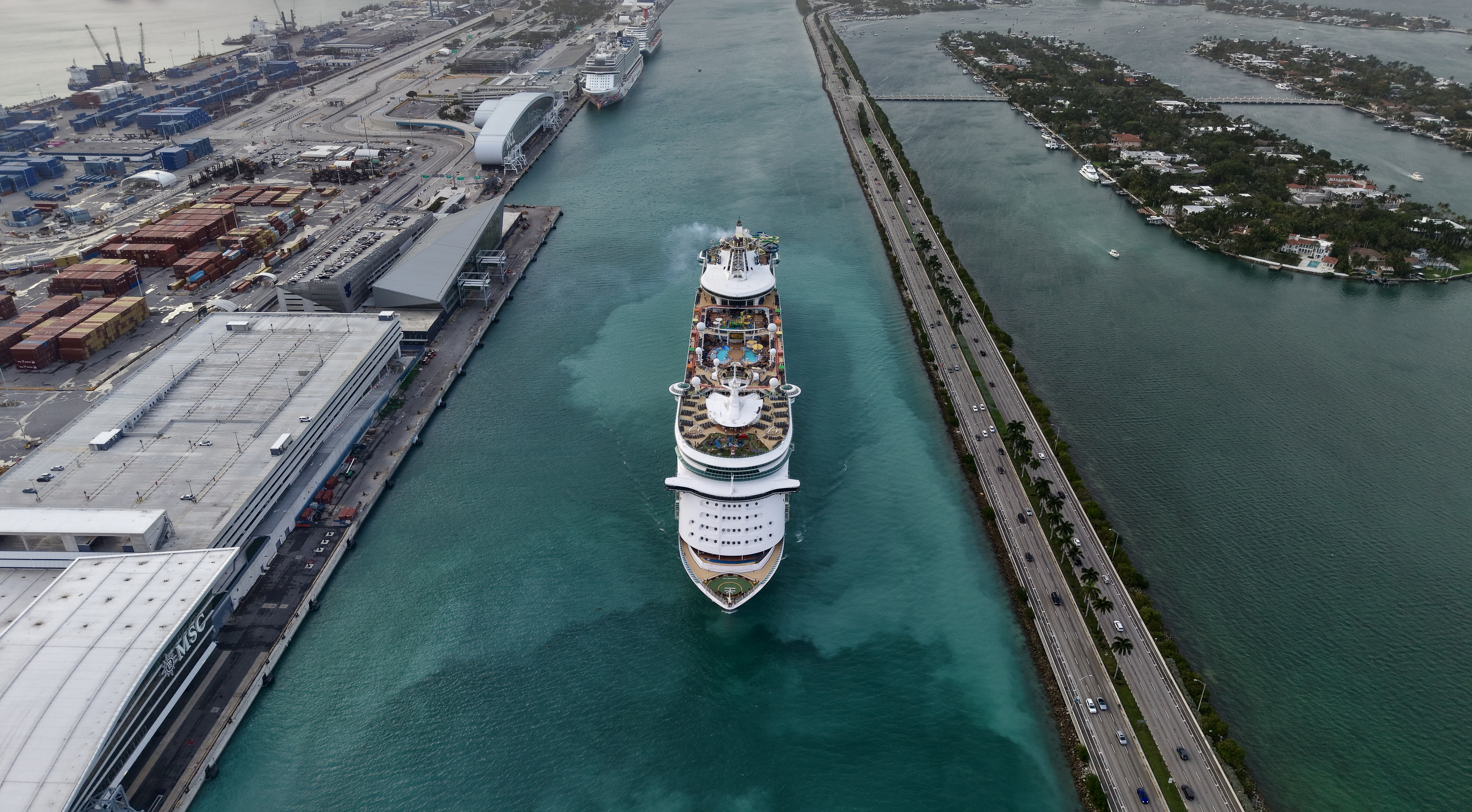
- Independence of the Seas, the last built vessel in the series departing PortMiami, on 18 January 2026

Class overview
- Builders: Aker Finnyards Turku Shipyard, Finland
- Operators: Royal Caribbean International
- Preceded by: Radiance class; Voyager class
- Succeeded by: Oasis class; Quantum class
- Built: 2004–2008
- In service: 2006–present
- Planned: 3
- Completed: 3
- Active: 3

General characteristics
- Type: Cruise ship
- Tonnage: 154,407 GT
- Length: 338.8 m (1,111 ft 6 in)
- Beam: 38.6 m (126 ft 8 in) at waterline; 56.0 m (183 ft 8 in) bridge wings
- Height: 63.7 m (209 ft) above water line
- Draft: 8.5 m (28 ft)
- Decks: 18 total, 15 passenger
- Installed power: 6 × Wärtsilä 12V46 diesels each rated at 12.6 MW (16,900 hp) driving electric generators at 514 rpm
- Propulsion: 3 × ABB Azipod podded electric propulsion units, two of them azimuthing, one fixed. 4 additional bow thrusters.
- Speed: 21.6 knots (40.0 km/h; 24.9 mph)
- Capacity: 4,370 passengers (double occupancy)
- Crew: 1,300 (average)
- Notes: Extended version of second generation Voyager class

The Freedom class is a group of three cruise ships for Royal Caribbean International. The first ship of the class, Freedom of the Seas, was the largest passenger ship in the world, and the largest ever built in terms of passenger capacity and gross tonnage when she was built in 2006. These two records were then shared by all three ships until the construction of Oasis of the Seas was completed in November 2009.

Freedom of the Seas left Aker Finnyards Turku Shipyard, Finland on 24 April 2006 and started regular sailings out of Miami the next month. The second ship of the class, Liberty of the Seas, sailed on her maiden voyage on 19 May 2007. The third ship of the class, Independence of the Seas, was delivered and started work out of Southampton in April 2008. While there was an option for a 4th ship, it never formulated into an order.

== Design ==
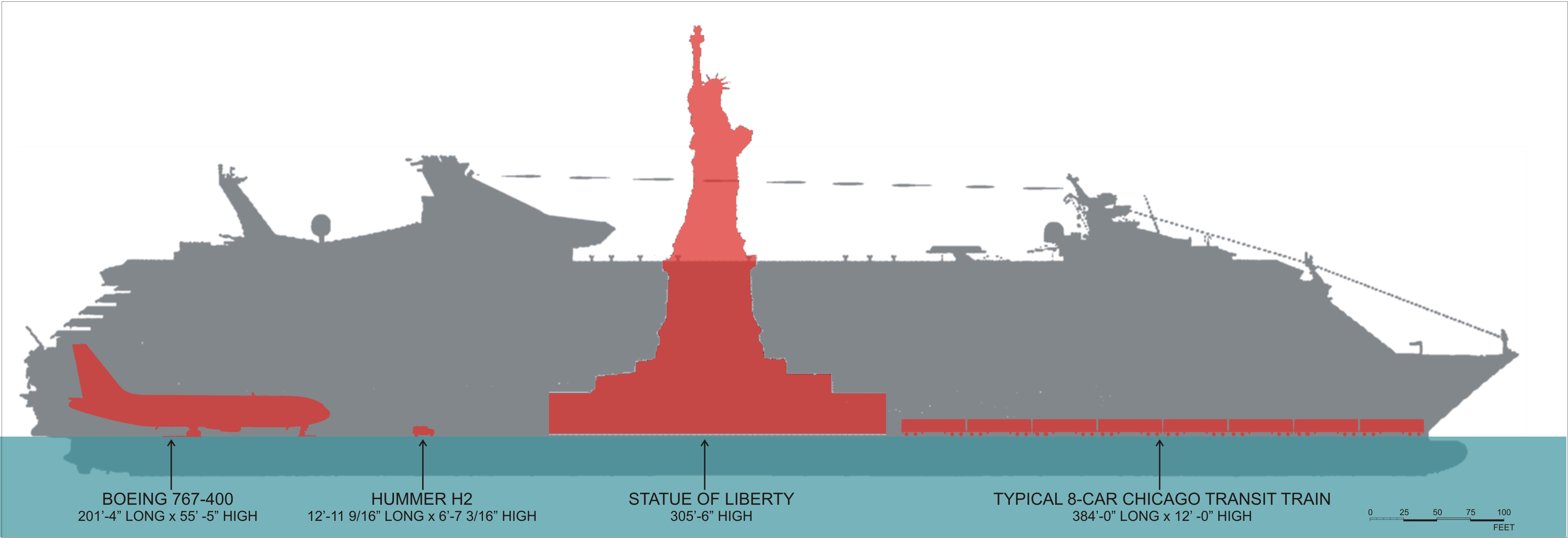
A Freedom-class ship compared with other large structures

The Freedom-class ships are virtually identical in design and layout to the earlier second-generation Voyager class, including an ice skating rink and a 136 m (446 ft) central atrium named the Royal Promenade, featuring a pub, shops, arcades, bars, and a 24-hour Cafe Promenade. New features added to the Freedom class include the FlowRider surf park, cantilevered whirlpools, and the H_{2}O Zone waterpark.

The first ship, Freedom of the Seas, is estimated to have cost US$800 million.

== Future ==
In March 2008, Aker Yards and Royal Caribbean announced a memorandum of agreement for a fourth ship in the class, subject to board approval and finalization of terms and conditions, but no actual order for the ship was ever announced. In 2011, Royal Caribbean announced that it had ordered two ships from the similarly sized Quantum class, making an order for a fourth Freedom-class ship unlikely.

== Ships ==
Ship	Year built	Entered service with Royal Caribbean	Gross tonnage	Notes	Image
Freedom of the Seas	2006	4 June 2006	156,271	Largest cruise ship in the world, 2006–2009. Refurbished January 2015. Underwent amplification in early 2020.	
Liberty of the Seas	2007	19 May 2007	155,889	Originally named Endeavor of the Seas before construction started. Underwent amplification in Late April 2026.	
Independence of the Seas	2008	2 May 2008	155,889	Refurbished April 2013 and April 2018.	
