= Cape Liberty Cruise Port =

Trans-Atlantic passenger terminal in New Jersey, United States

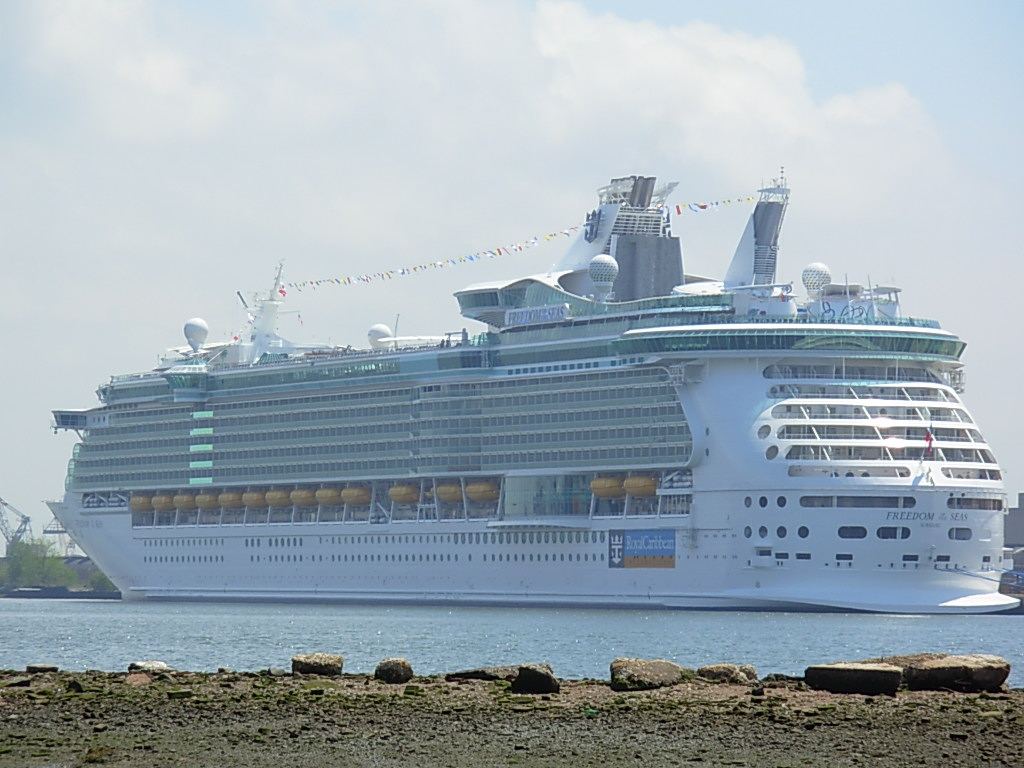
- Freedom of the Seas docked at the terminal

General information
- Location: Piers 11 and 12; 14 Port Terminal Boulevard, Bayonne, New Jersey 07002; United States
- Coordinates: 40.6646°N 74.07462°W
- Owner: Port Authority of New York and New Jersey
- Operator: Royal Caribbean Group; Metro Cruise Services
- Connections: 34th Street station (1.9 mi (3.1 km) to the west; access via cruise shuttles, taxis, and limousines)

Construction
- Structure type: Pier
- Parking: Yes
- Accessible: Yes

Other information
- Website: cruiseliberty.com

History
- Opened: May 2004
Location

The Cape Liberty Cruise Port is one of three trans-Atlantic passenger terminals in the Port of New York and New Jersey. It is located in Bayonne, New Jersey at the north side of the 2 mi (3.2 km) long pier of the Peninsula at Bayonne Harbor, a former military ocean terminal, and began operations in 2004.

== History ==
The Cape Liberty Cruise Port is located on a 430-acre (170 ha) site that had been originally developed for industrial uses in the 1930s and then taken over by the U.S. government during World War II as the Military Ocean Terminal at Bayonne. After conversion of a portion of the site for use as a passenger terminal with full customs and immigration facilities, in May 2004, the Voyager of the Seas became the first ship to depart from the site, the first time in almost four decades that a passenger ship had departed from a port in the state. The Voyager of the Seas was one of two ships to have her base of operations shifted to Bayonne from the Manhattan Cruise Terminal on the Hudson River waterfront of Manhattan's West Side.

== Operators ==
Royal Caribbean is one of the port's primary tenants. In May 2006 Freedom of the Seas – then the world's largest cruise ship – was christened in a broadcast carried live on the NBC's The Today Show. Celebrity Cruises bases Celebrity Summit out of Cape Liberty from May to October.

Before the cruise terminal opened in 2004, no cruise ships had been based out of the New Jersey Hudson Waterfront since the Hamburg-America Line left its Hoboken, New Jersey dock several decades previously.

Oasis of the Seas was originally supposed to begin to sail out of Cape Liberty in May 2020, but due to the COVID-19 pandemic, it ended up beginning to sail out in September 2021 for the 2022–24 seasons.

== Ferry service ==
The city of Bayonne has rented land from PANYNJ and is negotiating with SeaStreak to establish ferry service to Manhattan, with a terminal adjacent to the cruise port. Service was expected to begin in September 2020.

== See also ==
- Brooklyn Cruise Terminal
