= Independence of the Seas =

Freedom-class cruise ship, launched 2007

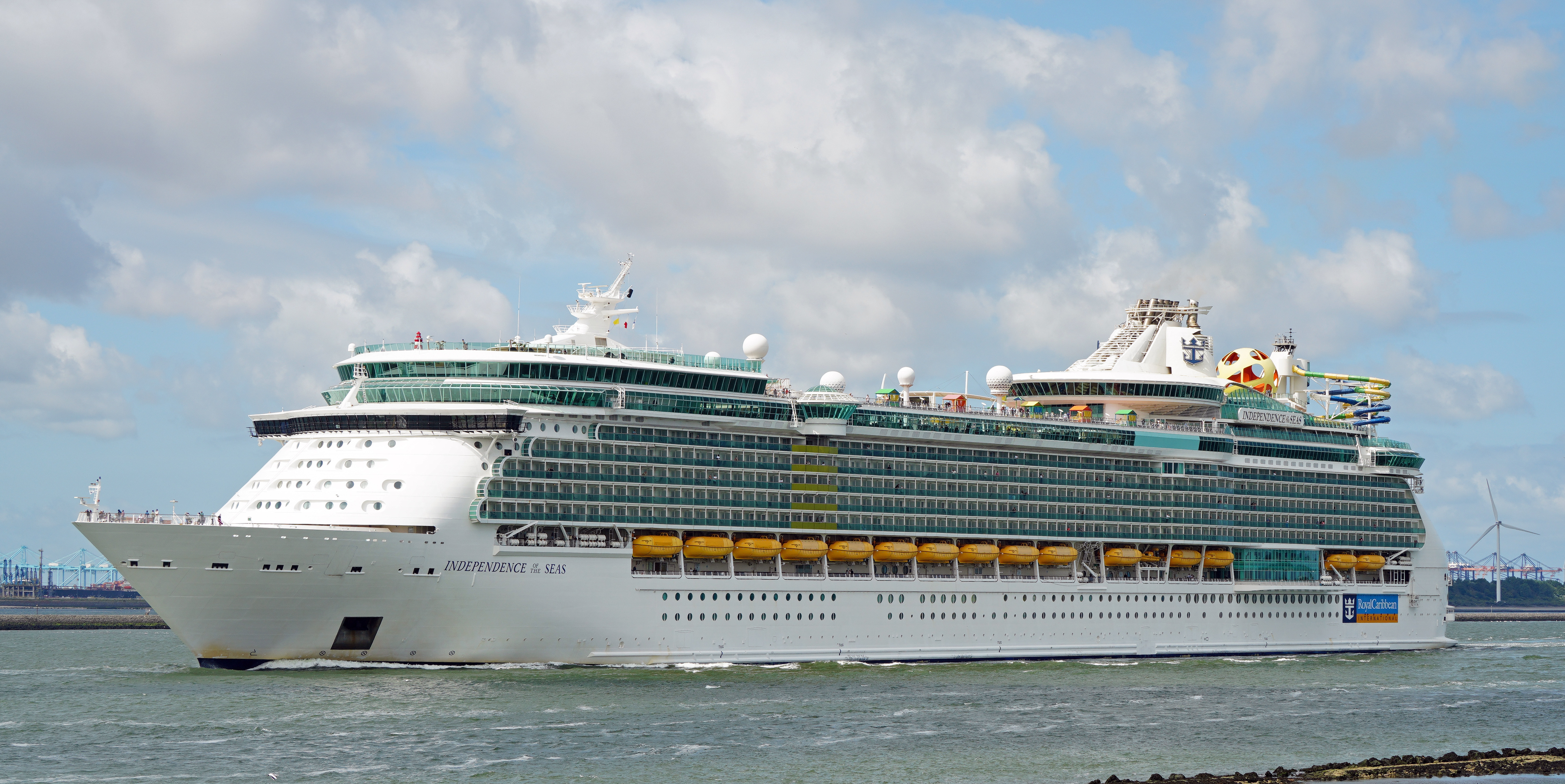
- Independence of the Seas near Hook of Holland, 2025

History

Bahamas
- Name: Independence of the Seas
- Owner: Royal Caribbean Group
- Operator: Royal Caribbean International
- Port of registry: Nassau, Bahamas
- Builder: Aker Finnyards Turku Shipyard, Finland
- Cost: ~US$828 million
- Launched: 14 September 2007
- Christened: April 30, 2008
- Maiden voyage: May 2, 2008
- In service: 2008–present
- Identification: Call sign: C6WW4; IMO number: 9349681; MMSI number: 309374000; ABS Class Number: 08293793
- Status: In service

General characteristics
- Class & type: Freedom-class cruise ship
- Tonnage: 155,889 GT
- Length: 338.72 m (1,111.3 ft)
- Beam: 38.6 m (127 ft) hull; 56 m (184 ft) extreme width of superstructure
- Height: 63.70 m (209 ft)
- Draught: 9 m (30 ft)
- Decks: 15 (passenger); 4 (crew)
- Propulsion: Diesel-electric; Two ABB Azipods and one Fixipod, 14 MW each
- Speed: 21.6 knots (40.0 km/h; 24.9 mph); 23 knots (43 km/h; 26 mph) (maximum)

Independence of the Seas is a Freedom-class cruise ship operated by Royal Caribbean International. The 15-deck ship was built in the Aker Finnyards Turku Shipyard, Finland. Originally built to be 154,407 GT, she joined Freedom of the Seas and Liberty of the Seas as the largest cruise ships and passenger vessels when she debuted. She is currently 1,111.3 feet (338.72 m) long and 155,889 GT, with a capacity of 4,635 passengers and 1,365 crew.

Independence of the Seas is the third of the Freedom-class vessels. In October 2009, Oasis of the Seas, the first ship in the Oasis class, displaced the Freedom class as the world's largest passenger ship.

== Operational history ==
The ship was christened on April 30, 2008, during a ceremony in Southampton by its godmother, Elizabeth Hill of Chesterfield, the founder of a children's disability charity.

The ship underwent an extensive dry dock refurbishment in April 2018: additional cabins were added, as well as the first trampoline park at sea, laser tag, water slides and an escape room designed in collaboration with Puzzle Break.

On May 22, 2014, the ship was arrested by port authorities in Ålesund, Norway for nonpayment of fees. The captain notified Royal Caribbean, which transferred NOK600,000 to cover port fees in less than an hour. The ship was then allowed to depart.

On December 11, 2017, 332 people became sick with a gastrointestinal illness (believed to be norovirus-related) after the ship had departed from Port Everglades in Fort Lauderdale, Florida for a five-night Caribbean cruise. Royal Caribbean initiated a deep-cleaning of the vessel after its return to port.

In 2025, the ship changed its classification society from DNV to American Bureau of Shipping.

Independence of the Seas has operated from ports in Europe and North America.

== Facilities ==
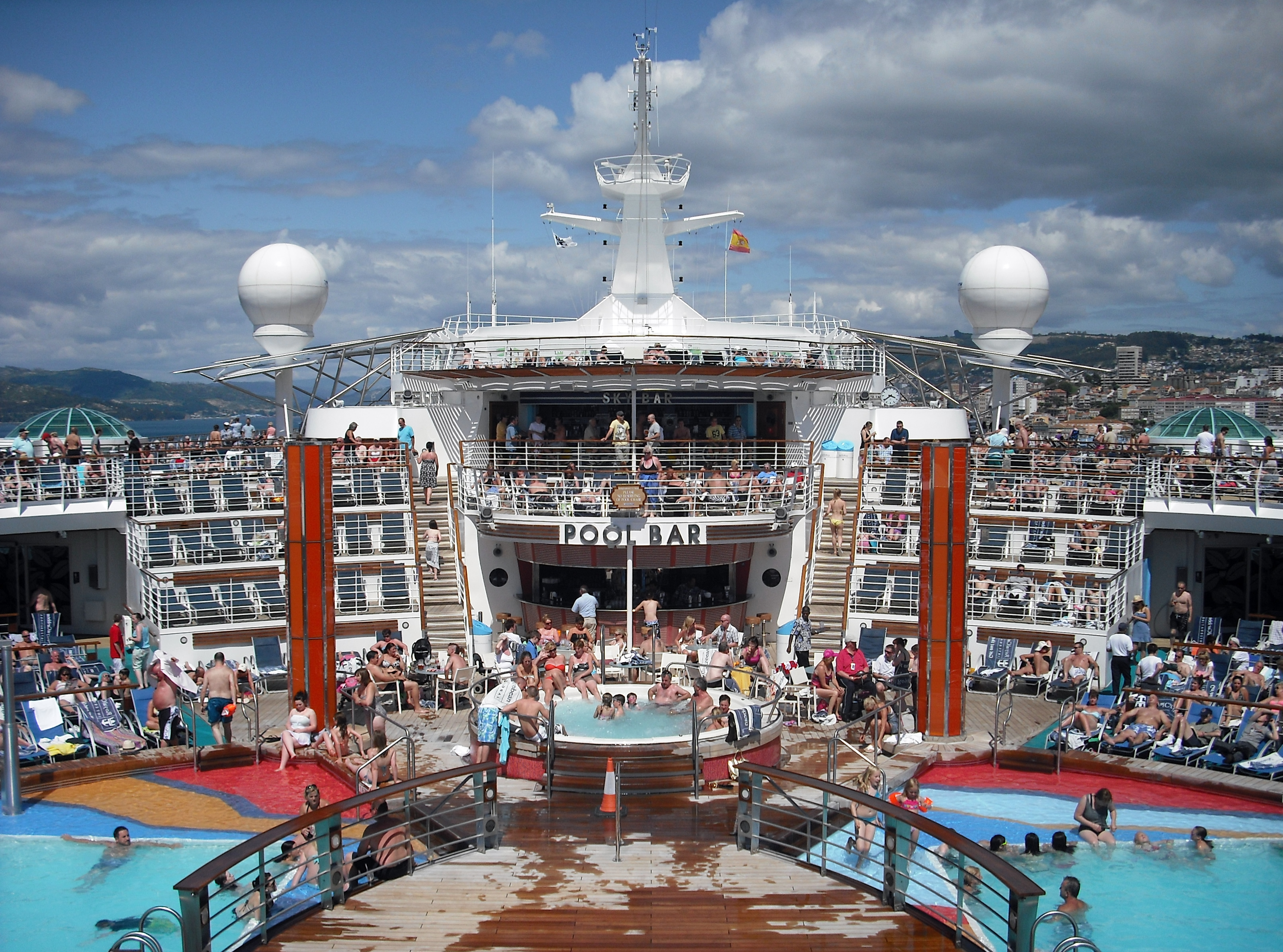
Pool Bar Area

Independence of the Seas facilities include an interactive water park, a dedicated water area for small children, and whirlpools which extend from the ship's sides. There is also a two-story theater, seating 1,200, an ice-skating rink and a complete conference center. On the Sports Deck, there is a rock climbing wall, the first ever trampolines at sea, a basketball/football court, water slides, and a FlowRider for surfing.

This ship hosts the annual 70000 Tons of Metal music festival.
