= Oasis of the Seas =

Cruise ship; first of the Oasis class

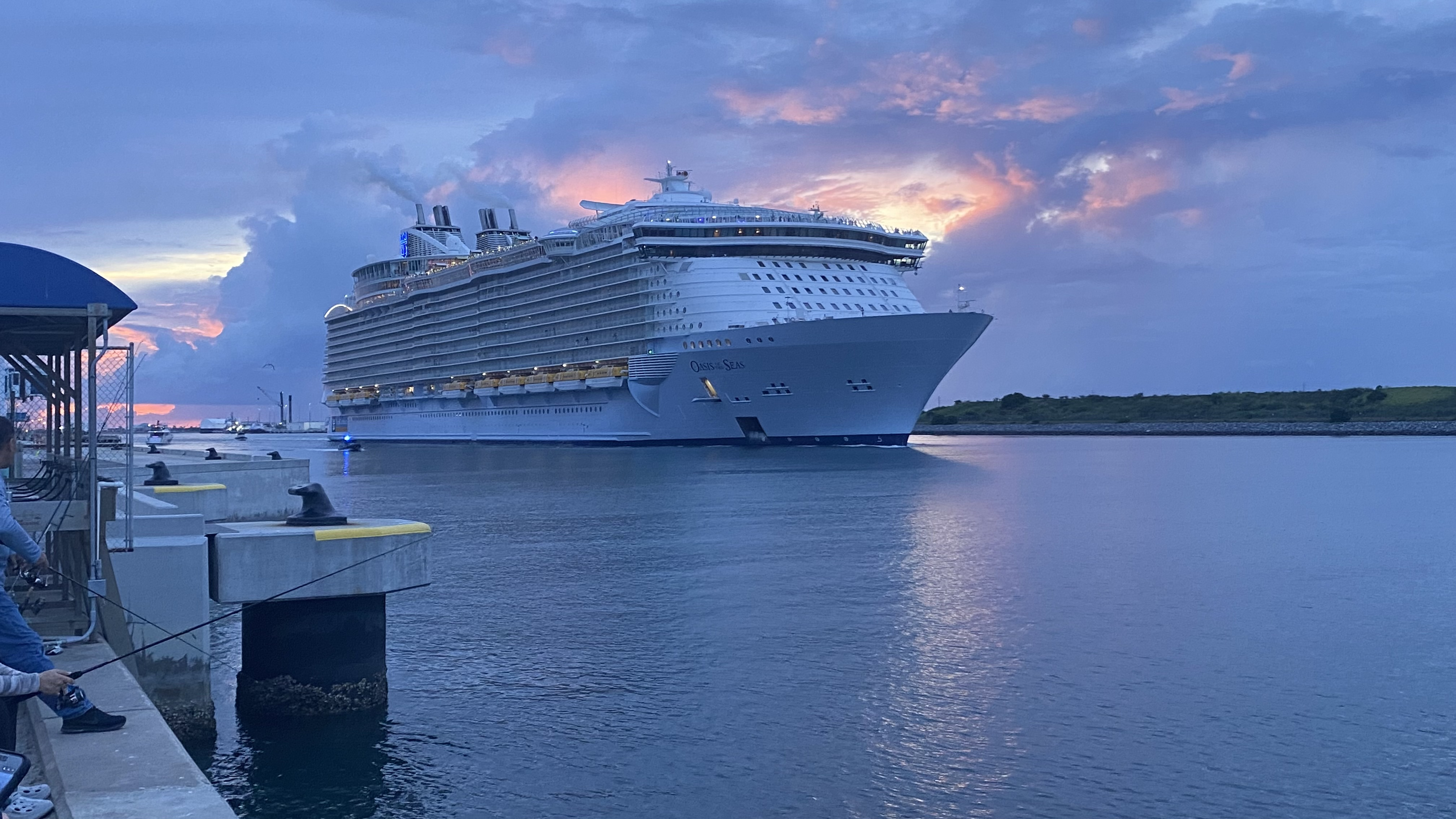
- Oasis of the Seas departs Port Canaveral on 1 September 2026

History

Bahamas
- Name: Oasis of the Seas
- Owner: Royal Caribbean Group
- Operator: Royal Caribbean International
- Port of registry: Nassau, Bahamas
- Route: Eastern and Western Caribbean; Bahamas
- Ordered: 6 February 2006
- Builder: STX Europe Turku Shipyard, Finland
- Cost: US$1.4 billion (2006)
- Yard number: 1363
- Laid down: 12 November 2007
- Launched: 21 November 2008 (float-out)
- Christened: 30 November 2009
- Completed: 28 October 2009
- Maiden voyage: 5 December 2009
- In service: 2009–present
- Refit: Amplification: 24 November 2019
- Home port: Cape Liberty (Bayonne), NJ (Summer months) ; Port Everglades (Fort Lauderdale), FL (Winter months)
- Identification: Call sign: C6XS7; IMO number: 9383936; MMSI number: 311020600; DNV ID: 27091
- Status: In service

General characteristics
- Class & type: Oasis-class cruise ship
- Tonnage: 226,838 GT; 257,429 NT; 15,000 DWT
- Length: 361.8 m (1,187 ft 0 in) overall
- Beam: 47 m (154 ft 2 in) waterline; 64.9 m (212 ft 11 in) max beam
- Height: 72 m (236 ft 3 in) above water line
- Draught: 9.322 m (30 ft 7.0 in)
- Depth: 22.55 m (74 ft 0 in)
- Decks: 16 passenger decks; 18 total decks
- Installed power: 3 × 13,860 kW (18,590 hp) Wärtsilä 12V46D; 3 × 18,480 kW (24,780 hp) Wärtsilä 16V46D
- Propulsion: 3 × 20 MW (27,000 hp) ABB Azipod, all azimuthing; 4 × 5.5 MW (7,400 hp) Wärtsilä CT3500; bow thrusters
- Speed: 24.5 knots (45.4 km/h; 28.2 mph)
- Capacity: 5,606 passengers at double occupancy; 6,699 maximum
- Crew: 2,165 on maiden voyage; 2,181 as of 2019

Oasis of the Seas is a cruise ship operated by Royal Caribbean International. She is the first of the Oasis class whose ships were the largest passenger ships in the world, until surpassed in 2024 by the Icon class. Her hull was laid down in November 2007 and she was completed and delivered to Royal Caribbean in October 2009. At the time of construction, Oasis of the Seas set a new capacity record of carrying 6,669 passengers. She was joined by sister ships Allure of the Seas in December 2010, Harmony of the Seas in May 2016, Symphony of the Seas in April 2018, and Wonder of the Seas in March 2022, as well as Utopia of the Seas in July 2024. As of November 2024, Oasis of the Seas conducts cruises in the Caribbean from her home port of Port Everglades in Fort Lauderdale, Florida, as well as Cape Liberty (Bayonne), New Jersey

Oasis of the Seas surpassed the Freedom-class cruise ships (also owned by Royal Caribbean) to become the largest cruise ship in the world at that time. Later, Oasis of the Seas was surpassed by Allure of the Seas by 50 millimetres (2.0 in). In May 2016, her second sister ship Harmony of the Seas became the new record holder with a length of 362.12 metres (1,188.1 ft), and in March 2018, Symphony of the Seas, the fourth member of the Oasis class, became the new world's largest cruise ship with a length of 361.012 metres (1,184 ft 5.1 in) and a tonnage of 228,081 GT.

== History ==
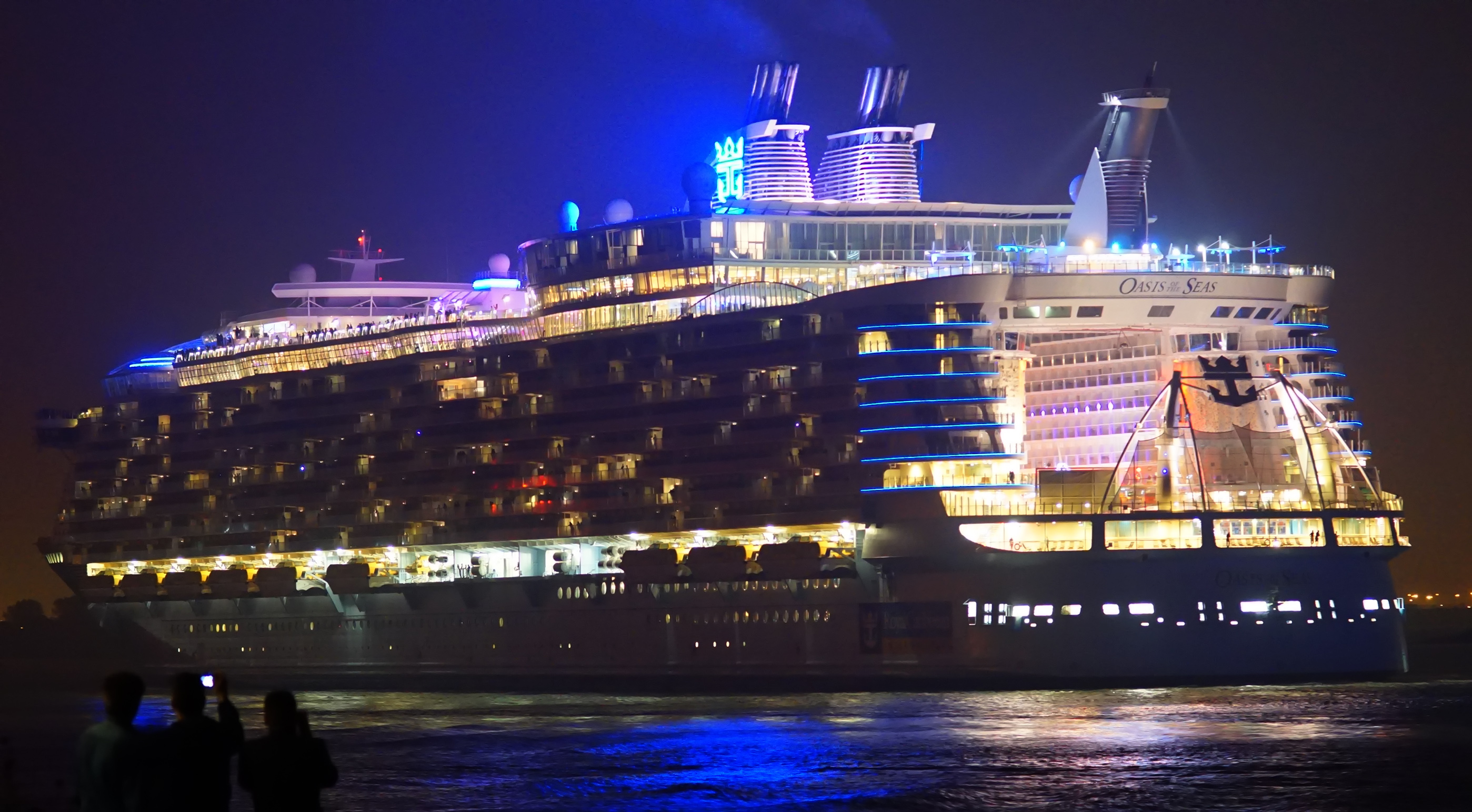
Oasis of the Seas at night before renovation

The vessel was ordered in February 2006 and designed under the name "Project Genesis". Her keel was laid down on 12 November 2007 by STX Europe Turku Shipyard, Finland. The company announced that full funding for Oasis of the Seas was secured on 15 April 2009.

The name Oasis of the Seas resulted from a competition held in May 2008. The ship was formally named on 30 November 2009 during a charity sailing for Make-A-Wish Foundation. At this ceremony the ship was sponsored by seven "godmothers", each representing one of the seven neighborhoods on board. Her godmothers are Gloria Estefan, Michelle Kwan, Dara Torres, Keshia Knight Pulliam, Shawn Johnson, Jane Seymour and Daisy Fuentes.

During the first float-out of the vessel the tugboats that were pulling the ship from its dock failed to control the ship, resulting in the port side of the ship hitting the dock. This resulted in some cosmetic damage and minor damage to the hull, which was repaired and did not affect the final delivery date of the vessel.

The ship was completed and turned over to Royal Caribbean on 28 October 2009. Two days later, she departed Finland for the United States. While exiting the Baltic Sea, the vessel passed underneath the Great Belt Fixed Link in Denmark on 31 October 2009 at 23:18 UTC. The bridge has a clearance of 65 m (213 ft) above the water; Oasis of the Seas normally has an air draft of 72 m (236 ft 3 in). The passage under the bridge was possible due to retraction of the telescoping funnels, and an additional 30 cm (12 in) was gained by the squat effect whereby vessels traveling at speed in a shallow channel will be drawn deeper into the water. Approaching the bridge at 23 knots (43 km/h; 26 mph), the ship passed under it with less than 60 centimetres (2 ft) of clearance.

Proceeding through the English Channel, Oasis of the Seas stopped briefly in the Solent so that 300 shipyard workers who were on board doing finishing work could disembark, then left on the way to her intended home port of Port Everglades in Fort Lauderdale, Florida. The ship arrived there on 13 November 2009, where tropical plants were installed prior to some introductory trips and her maiden voyage on 5 December 2009.

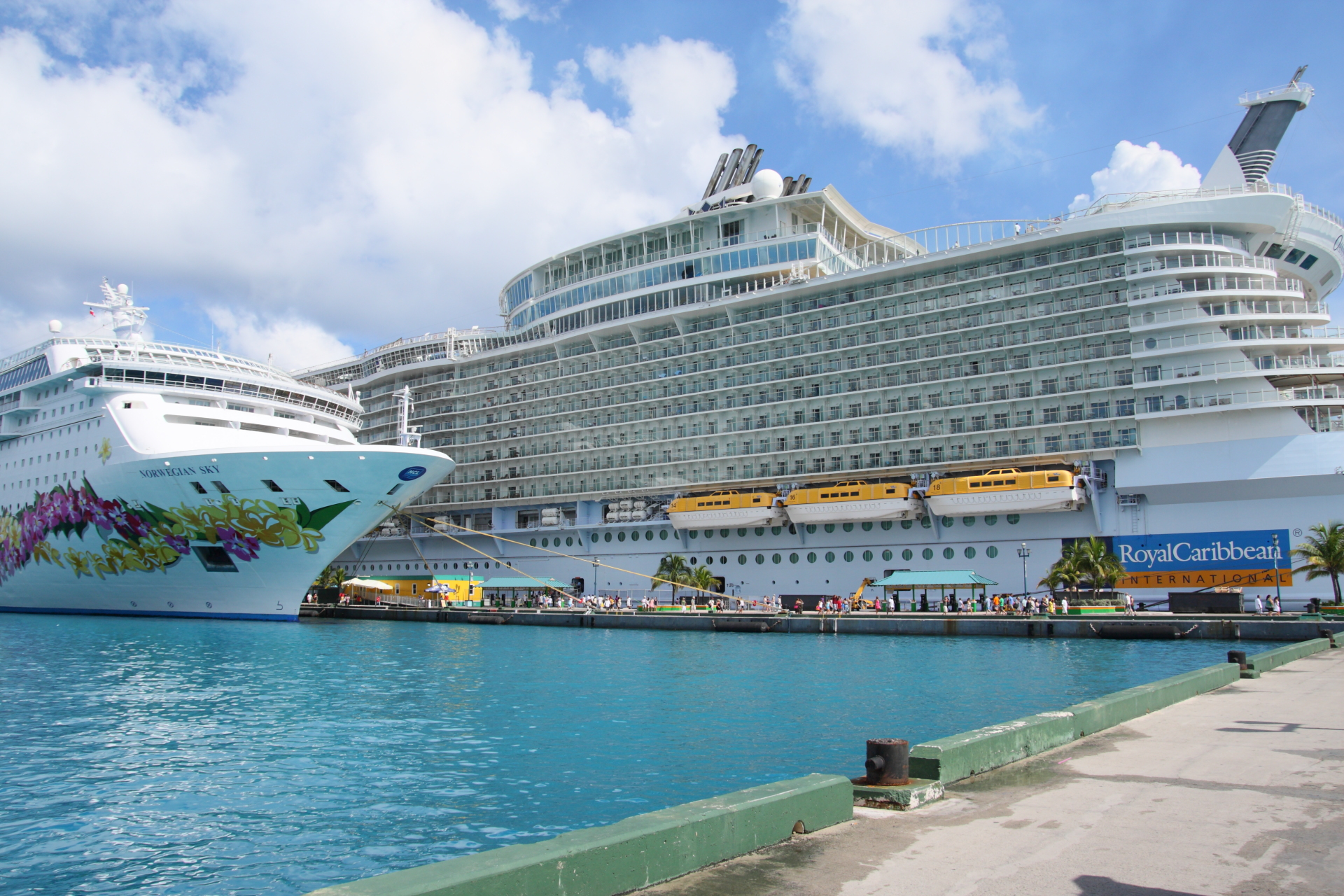
Oasis of the Seas docked at Nassau, Bahamas with Norwegian Sky (Later; Cordelia Sky) on 22 May 2025

Oasis of the Seas had a minor refit in winter 2011. She underwent a second drydock refit in October 2014. During drydock the ship was modified by dividing the main dining room into three separate restaurants.

Oasis of the Seas was scheduled to cruise the Mediterranean out of Barcelona in summer 2019 before undergoing a major drydock at the end of the season. After spending nearly three months in dry dock receiving upgrades and new amenities, Oasis of the Seas then repositioned to her new homeport of Miami for the fall and winter 2019 seasons. She was scheduled to move to Cape Liberty Cruise Port in May 2020, becoming the first Oasis-class vessel to ever be homeported there.

== Design and description ==
Size comparison of the Oasis of the Seas and the Titanic

The gross tonnage (GT) of Oasis of the Seas at launch was 225,282, but it was expanded to 226,838 GT when additional cabins were added to Deck 14 in 2019. Her displacement—the actual mass of the vessel—is estimated at 100,000 metric tons (98,000 long tons), slightly less than that of an American Nimitz-class aircraft carrier.

To keep the ship stable without increasing the draft excessively, the designers created a wide hull; 9.3 metres (30 ft 6 in) of the ship sits beneath the water, a small percentage of the ship's overall height. Wide, shallow ships such as this tend to be "snappy", meaning that they can snap back upright after a wave has passed, which can be uncomfortable. This effect, however, is mitigated by the vessel's large size. The cruise ship later proved stable when encountering winds "almost up to hurricane force" and seas in excess of 12 metres (39 ft).

=== Propulsion and power ===
The ship's power comes from six medium-speed, marine-diesel generating sets: three 16-cylinder Wärtsilä 16V46D common rail engines producing 18,860 kilowatts (25,290 hp) each and three similar 12-cylinder Wärtsilä 12V46D engines producing 13,860 kilowatts (18,590 hp) each. The fuel consumption of the main engines at full power is 1,377 US gallons (5,210 L; 1,147 imp gal) of fuel oil per engine per hour for the 16-cylinder engines and 1,033 US gallons (3,910 L; 860 imp gal) per engine per hour for the 12-cylinder engines. The total output of these prime movers, some 97,020 kilowatts (130,110 hp), is converted to electricity, used in hotel power for operation of the lights, elevators, electronics, galleys, water treatment plant, and all of the other systems used on the operation of the vessel, as well as propulsion. Propulsion is provided by three 20,000-kilowatt (26,800 hp) Azipods, ABB's brand of electric azimuth thrusters. These pods, suspended under the stern, contain electric motors driving 20-foot (6 m) propellers. Because they are rotatable, no rudders are needed to steer the ship. Docking is assisted by four 5,500-kilowatt (7,380 hp) transverse bow thrusters.

Additional power comes from solar panels fitted by BAM Energy Group, which provide energy for lighting in the promenade and central park areas. The installation cost US$750,000 and covers 1,950 square metres (21,000 ft^{2}) on deck 19.

=== Lifeboats ===
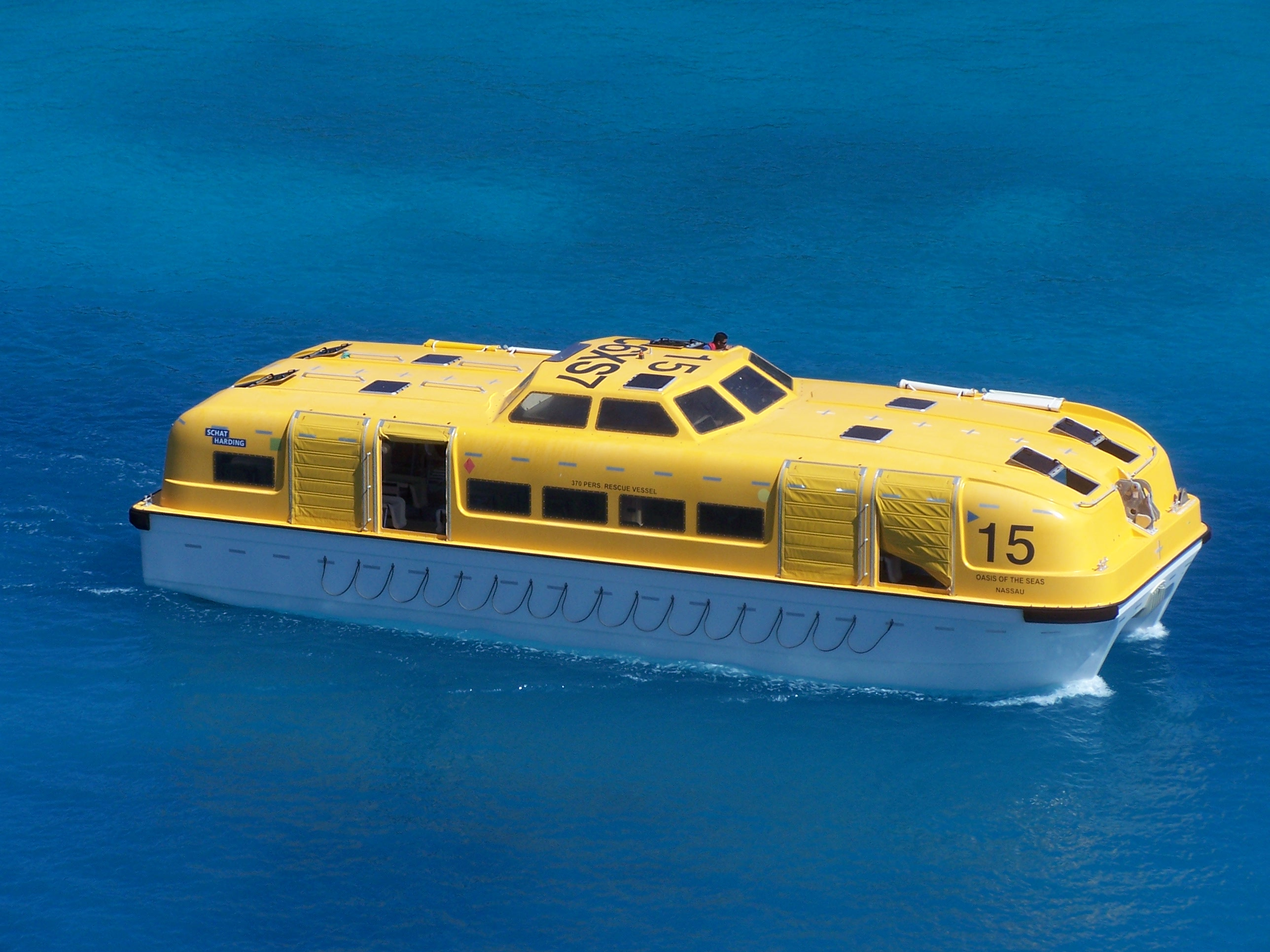
One of the ship's lifeboats

The ship carries 18 lifeboats that hold 370 people each, for a total of 6,660 people. Inflatable life rafts are provided for any additional passengers and crew.

=== Facilities ===
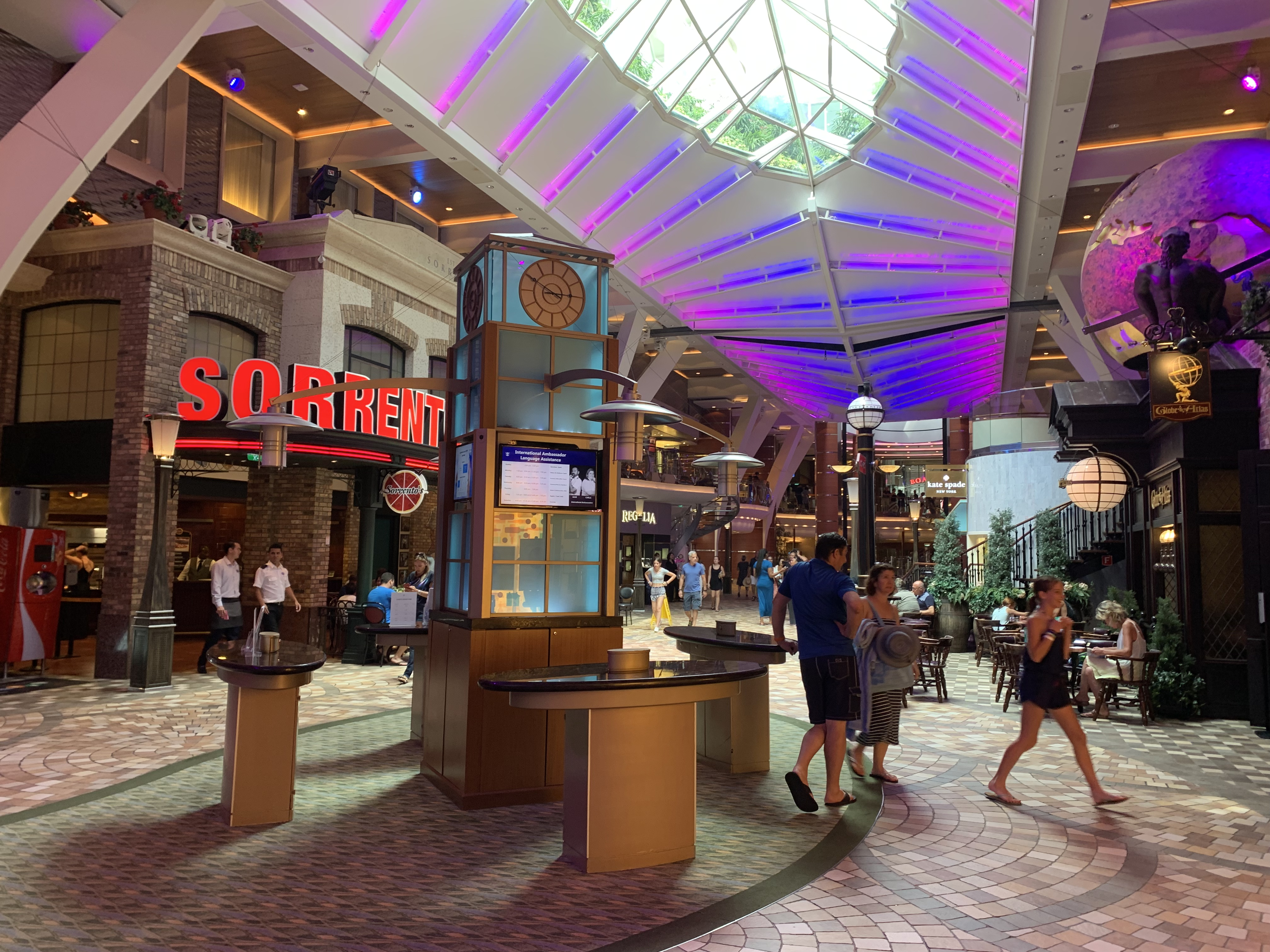
A view of the Royal Promenade shopping area

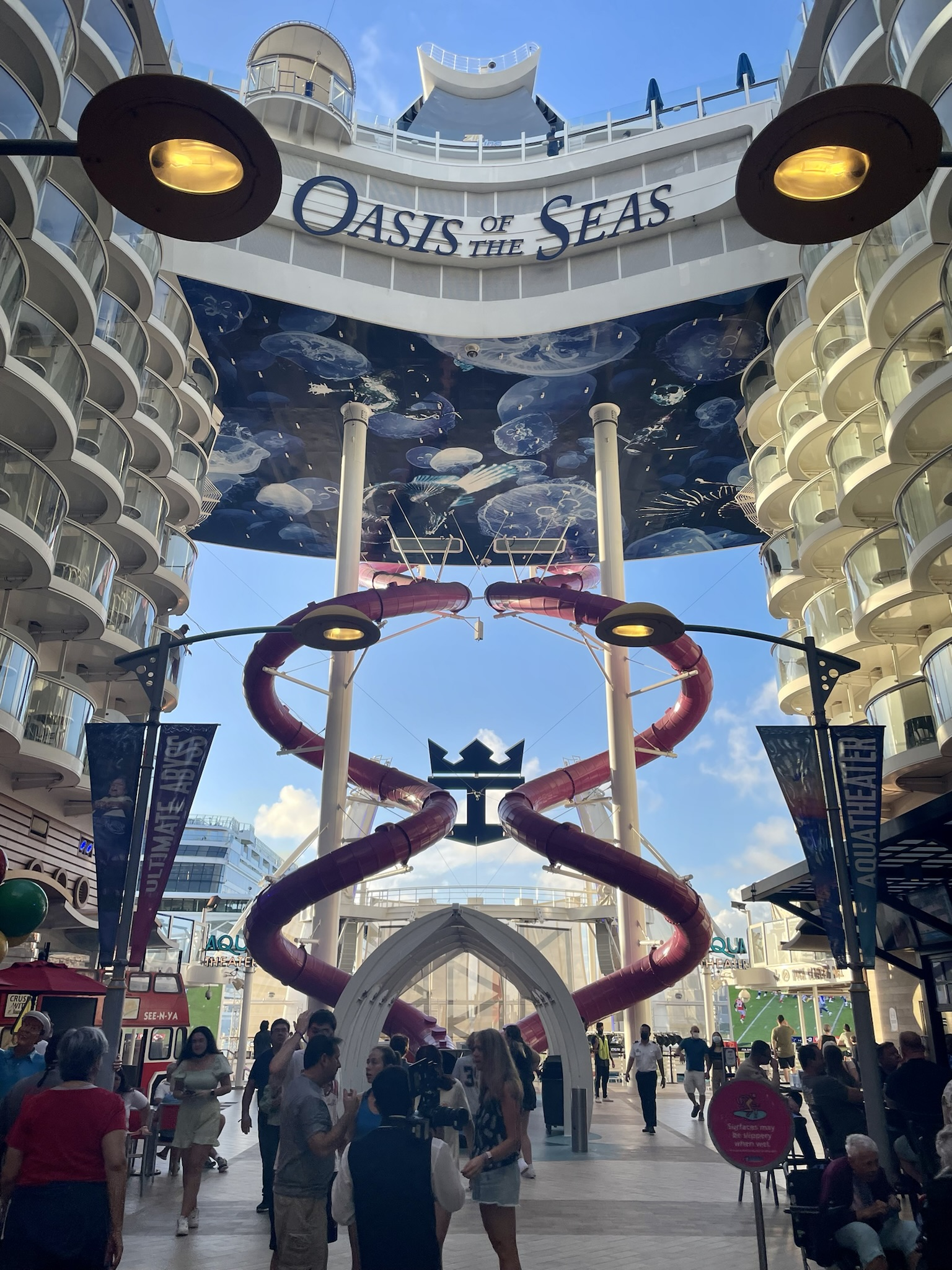
Oasis of the Seas Boardwalk

The ship features a zip-line, an ice-skating rink, a surf simulator, an aquatic amphitheater, a moving bar, a casino, a miniature golf course, multiple night clubs, several bars and lounges, a karaoke club, comedy club, five swimming pools, three waterslides, volleyball and basketball courts, youth zones, and nurseries for children. Oasis of the Seas also features the largest dry-slide at sea, the "Ultimate Abyss." Many of the ship's interiors were decorated by muralist Clarissa Parish.

== History ==
In January 2015, a 20-year old passenger fell overboard while the ship was sailing off the coast of Cozumel, Mexico. Five hours later, the passenger was rescued from the water by Disney Magic.

That November, another passenger fell overboard from the balcony near the Turks and Caicos Islands. His death was ruled a suicide and not a domestic violence dispute, but the passenger's attorney alleged he committed suicide in an act of protest against homophobic discrimination from Royal Caribbean.

On 1 April 2019, two cranes collapsed on the ship during maintenance in the Bahamas. Eight people suffered non-life-threatening injuries, and extensive damage to the ship required it to relocate to Cádiz for repairs. The ship returned to service on 5 May, but three sailings were cancelled during its downtime.

On 20 December 2019, Oasis of the Seas was almost struck by Carnival Legend while in port in Cozumel, Mexico.

In January 2020, a 46-year old passenger fell overboard and was fatally injured while the ship was docked in Puerto Rico.

In January 2022, a passenger died unexpectedly aboard Oasis of the Seas while sailing during the "Oasis Caribbean Cruise", a chartered trip by Atlantis Events. In January 2024, another passenger died aboard the ship during a similarly chartered cruise.

=== COVID-19 pandemic ===
During a March 8 to 15, 2020 sailing, Royal Caribbean notified the U.S. Centers for Disease Control and Prevention of a possible COVID-19 infection aboard Oasis of the Seas. All passengers disembarked at PortMiami on March 15 and Royal Caribbean stopped passenger sailings as the global pandemic took hold. Two weeks later, 14 Oasis of the Seas crew members tested positive for COVID-19 infections. By April 20, 2020, two crew members remaining aboard Oasis of the Seas had died of COVID-19 in hospital in Florida. In early May, a third crew member had died of COVID-19.

=== Return to Port Everglades ===
After spending the summer months in the Mediterranean, Oasis of the Seas returned to her new home port of Port Everglades in November 2024. This marked the first time the ship had been homeported in Port Everglades since November 2016.
