= MS Freedom of the Seas =

Cruise ship; first of her class

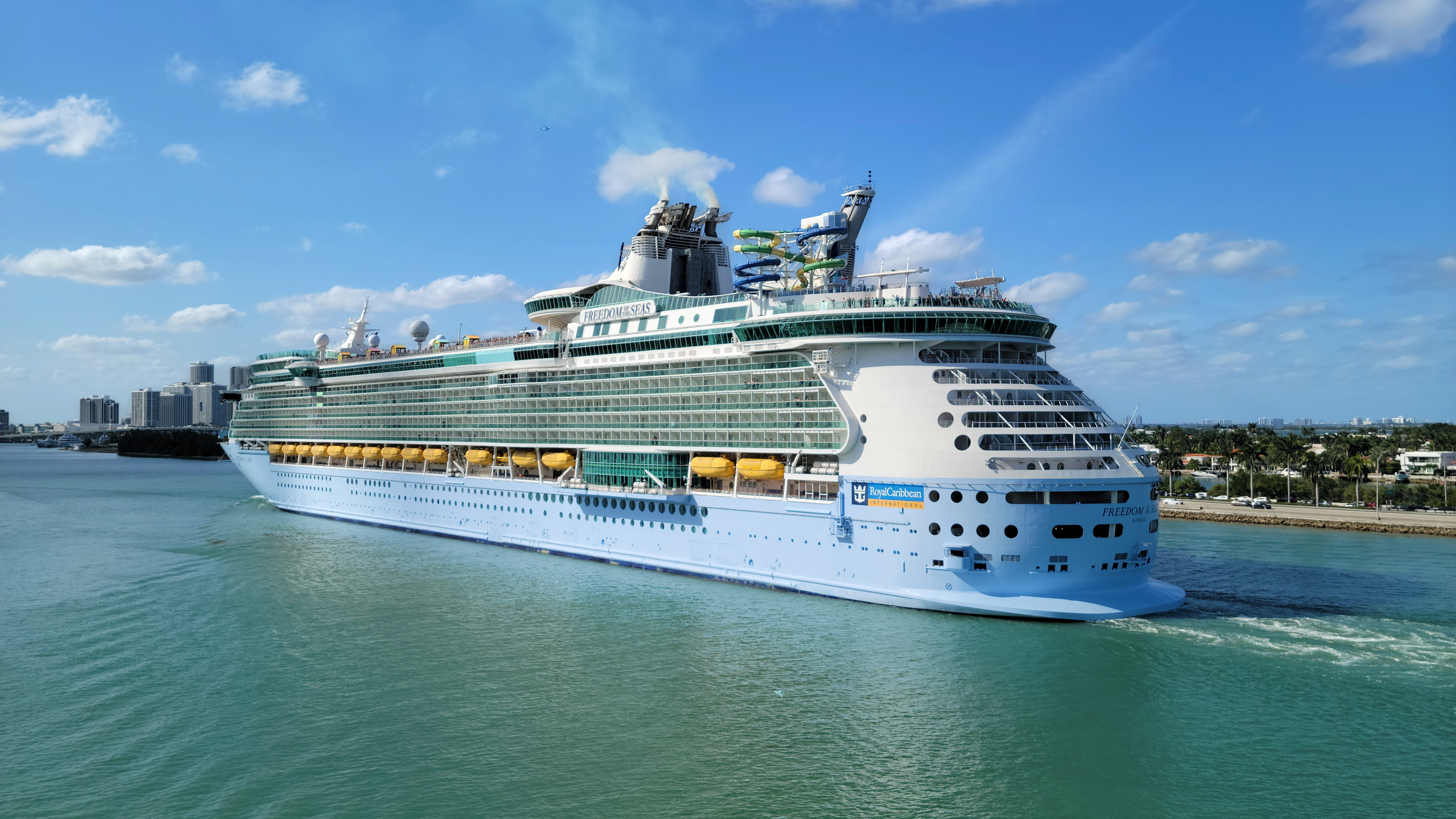
- Freedom of the Seas sailing out of Terminal A at Miami, US on 15 March 2024

History

Bahamas
- Name: Freedom of the Seas
- Owner: Freedom of the Seas Inc.
- Operator: Royal Caribbean International
- Port of registry: Nassau, (The Bahamas)
- Route: San Juan, Puerto Rico & Caribbean
- Ordered: 18 September 2003
- Builder: Aker Yards Turku Shipyard, Finland
- Cost: US$800 million
- Yard number: 52
- Laid down: 9 November 2004
- Launched: 19 August 2005
- Christened: 12 May 2006
- Completed: 24 April 2006
- Maiden voyage: 4 June 2006 (Caribbean)
- In service: 2006–present
- Identification: Call sign: C6UZ7; IMO number: 9304033; DNV ID: 25177; MMSI number: 309906000
- Status: In service

General characteristics
- Class & type: Freedom-class cruise ship
- Tonnage: 156,271 GT (2015–present); 154,407 GT (2006–2015)
- Length: 338.774 m (1,111 ft 5.6 in)
- Beam: 38.60 m (126.64 ft) waterline 56.08 m (184 ft) extreme (bridge wings)
- Height: 63.70 m (209 ft)
- Draught: 9.026 metres (29 ft 7.4 in)
- Decks: 19 total decks, 15 passenger decks
- Installed power: 6 × Wärtsilä 12V46 (6 × 12,600 kW (16,900 hp))
- Propulsion: Diesel-electric; Three ABB Azipod units, two azimuthing and one fixed.; Four bow thrusters
- Speed: 21.6 knots (40.0 km/h; 24.9 mph)
- Capacity: 3,782 (double occupancy); 4,515 (maximum occupancy)
- Crew: 1,360

MS Freedom of the Seas is a cruise ship operated by Royal Caribbean International. She is the namesake of Royal Caribbean's Freedom class, and can accommodate 3,634 passengers and 1,300 crew on fifteen passenger decks. The vessel also has 4 crew decks below the waterline. Freedom of the Seas was the largest passenger ship ever built (by gross tonnage) from 2006 until the record was tied by sister ship Liberty of the Seas in 2007.

== Construction and design ==
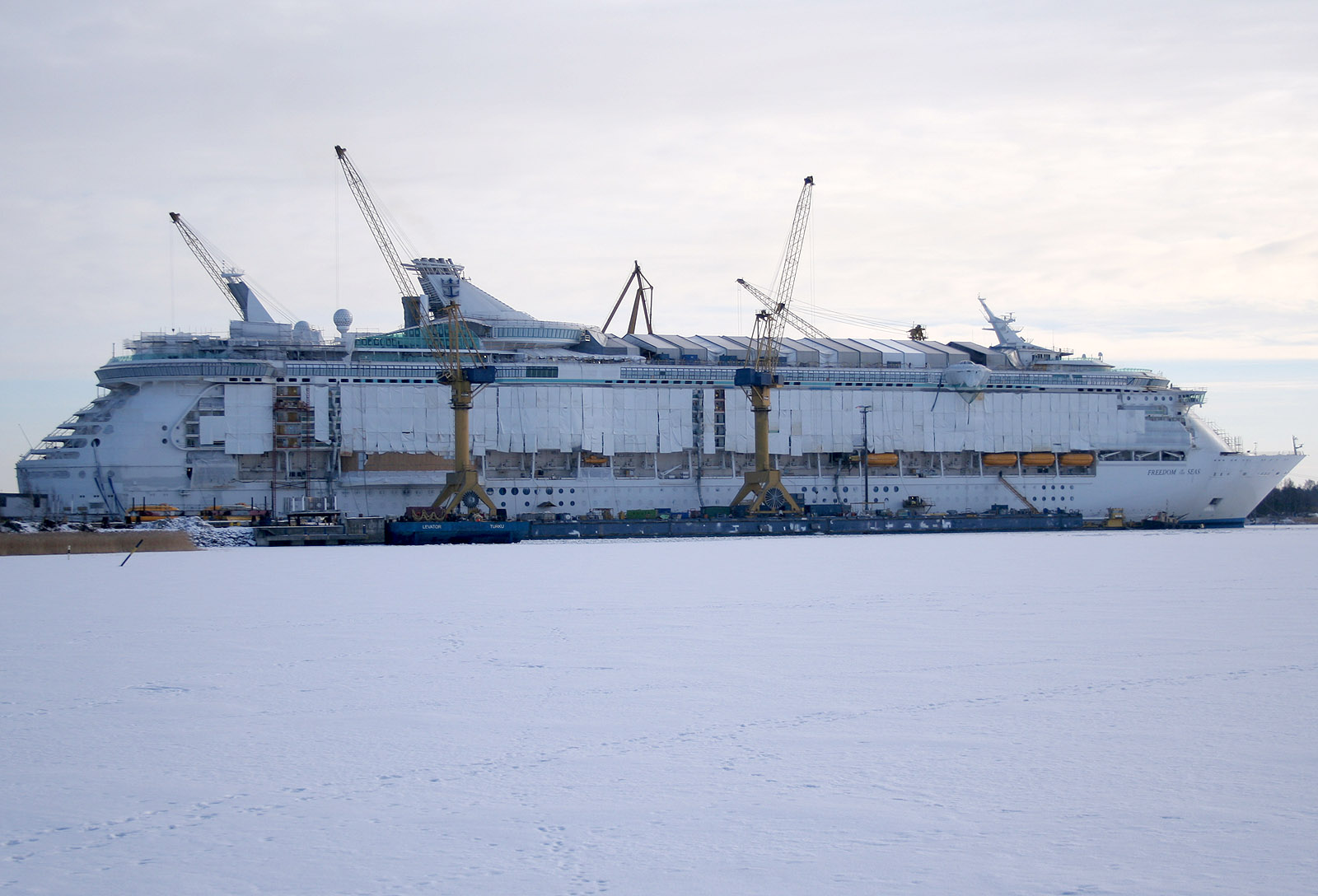
Freedom of the Seas under construction at Turku Shipyard in Turku, Finland on 23 February 2006

Freedom of the Seas was built at the Aker Yards Turku Shipyard, Finland, which built the ships of the Voyager class as well as the other ships of the Freedom class. Upon her completion in 2006, she became the largest passenger ship ever built, taking the record from Queen Mary 2.

Freedom of the Seas is 2.4 metres (7 ft 10 in) narrower than Queen Mary 2 at the waterline, 6 metres (19 ft 8 in) shorter, has 1.5 metres (4 ft 11 in) less draft, is 8.3 metres (27 ft 3 in) less tall and 8 knots (15 km/h) slower. Freedom of the Seas however is the larger ship in terms of gross tonnage. Its gross tonnage as verified by Det Norske Veritas, a Norwegian marine classification society, was 154,407 GT, compared with Queen Mary 2's 148,528 GT. Freedom of the Seas had the highest gross tonnage of any passenger ship yet built until the 2007 completion of Liberty of the Seas.

The ship has four bow thrusters. When at sea Freedom of the Seas consumes approximately 12,800 kg (28,200 lb) of fuel per hour.

=== Facilities ===
The ship has an interior promenade 136 m (445 ft) long called the "Royal Promenade".

The ship has three swimming areas: an interactive water park, a dedicated adult pool, and the main pool. Deck 13 has a sports area with a rock climbing wall, the FlowRider surf simulator, a miniature golf course and a full size basketball court. Other items include an ice skating rink, a casino and a three-deck-high broadway-style theater. Many of the ship's interiors were extensively decorated by muralist Clarissa Parish.

== Service history ==
The ship docked at Blohm und Voss in Hamburg, Germany, on 17 April 2006 to repair a damaged bearing in one of the three Azipod propulsion units and some minor modifications prior to her official handover to Royal Caribbean International on 24 April 2006. She then visited Oslo, Norway, before sailing for Southampton, England. The ship sailed on its first transatlantic crossing on 3 May 2006.

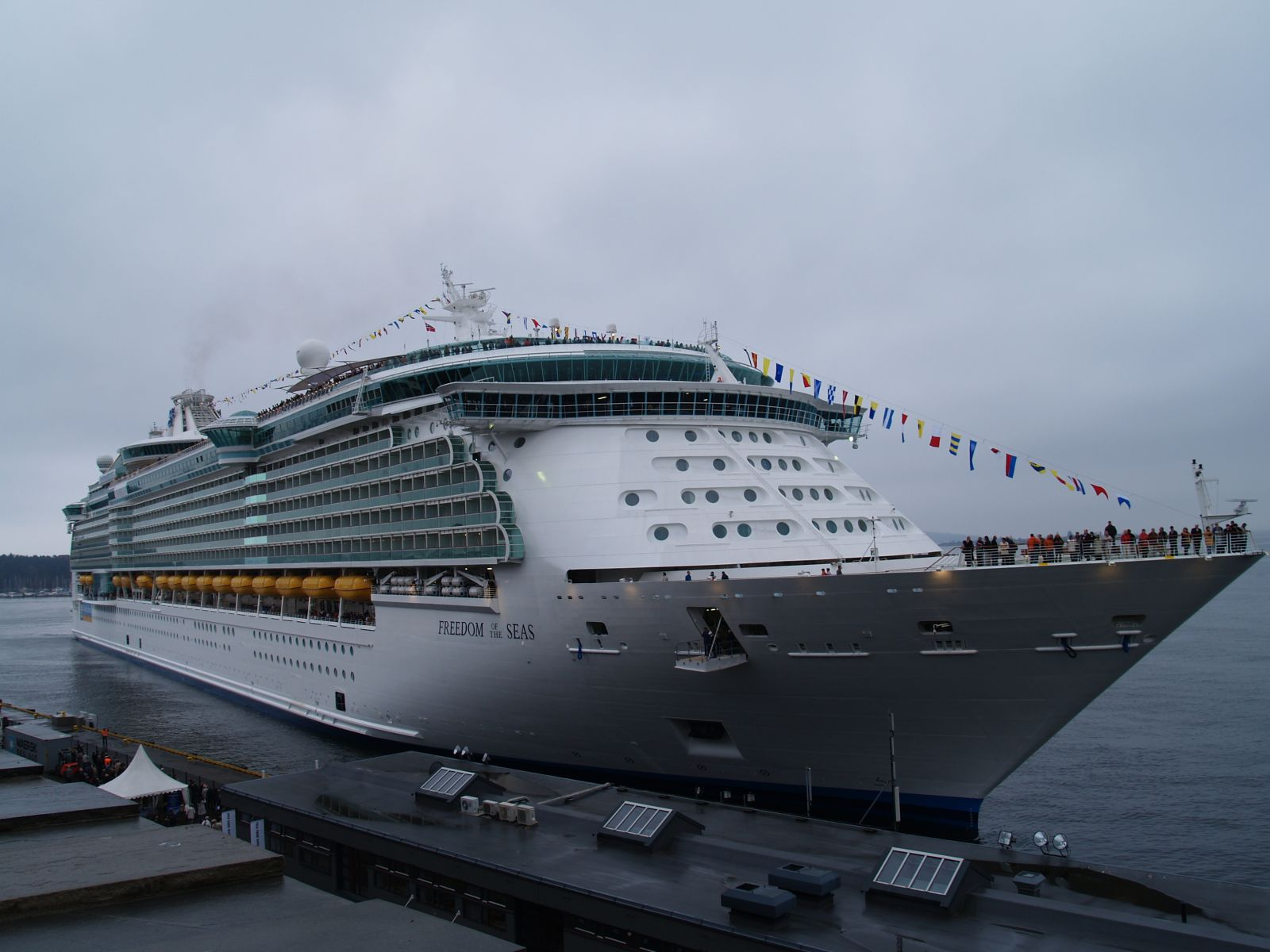
Freedom of the Seas at Oslo on 26 April 2006

Freedom of the Seas arrived in New York Harbor, United States, for her official naming ceremony on 12 May 2006 which was broadcast live on NBC's The Today Show from Cape Liberty Cruise Port in Bayonne, New Jersey (the ship's official New York berth), and thereafter traveled to Boston for the weekend of 19–22 May. The ship's godmother was selected as Katherine Louise Calder, a Portland, Oregon foster care provider. She began operations out of Miami with her first cruise and maiden voyage on 4 June, sailing to western Caribbean locations.

On 4 May 2009, Freedom of the Seas moved her home port from the Port of Miami-Dade to Port Canaveral. The ship underwent her first dry dock refurbishment in March 2011. In January 2015, the ship underwent another 24-day dry dock. During the dry dock some new interior passenger cabins were added. On 22 July 2015, a fire started in a mechanical area of the ship around 9:15 AM when the ship was en route from Cape Canaveral, Florida to Falmouth, Jamaica. All passengers were sent to their muster stations, and one crew member sustained first degree burns. The fire was extinguished after an hour and a half, and the ship was able to continue on its planned itinerary.

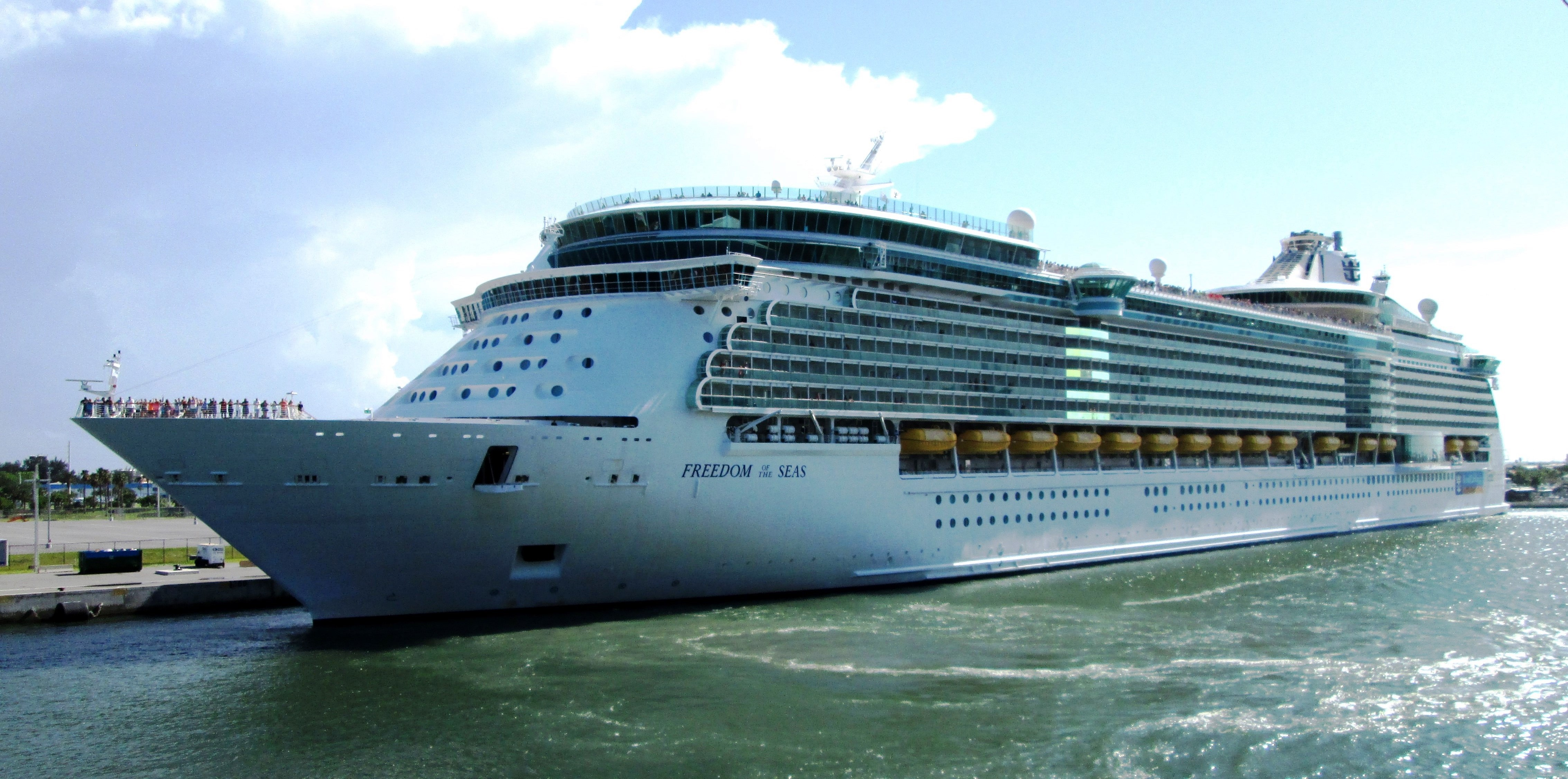
Freedom of the Seas at Port Canaveral in 2016, after her 2015 refurbishment

In winter 2016, Freedom of the Seas re-positioned to Port Everglades, from where she undertook cruises in the Caribbean. After homeporting at Barcelona in the early and mid 2017, Freedom of the Seas returned to Port Everglades. In May 2018, she commenced sailing Southern Caribbean sailings out of San Juan, Puerto Rico until April 2021.

On 7 July 2019, an 18-month old child died after falling through an open window on the 11th deck while the ship was docked in San Juan, Puerto Rico. Her grandfather had placed her on a railing and lost his grip while holding her. The grandfather claimed that he was colourblind and did not notice that the window was open, but the cruise line released security camera footage that they claim shows him leaning out the window shortly before lifting the toddler up to it. On 11 December 2019, the child's parents sued Royal Caribbean Cruises over the death of their daughter, alleging that the company was negligent for not properly securing the windows. The grandfather pled guilty to a charge of negligent homicide on 25 February, and was placed on probation for three years as part of a plea deal.

Freedom of the Seas underwent a $116 million dry dock in early 2020.

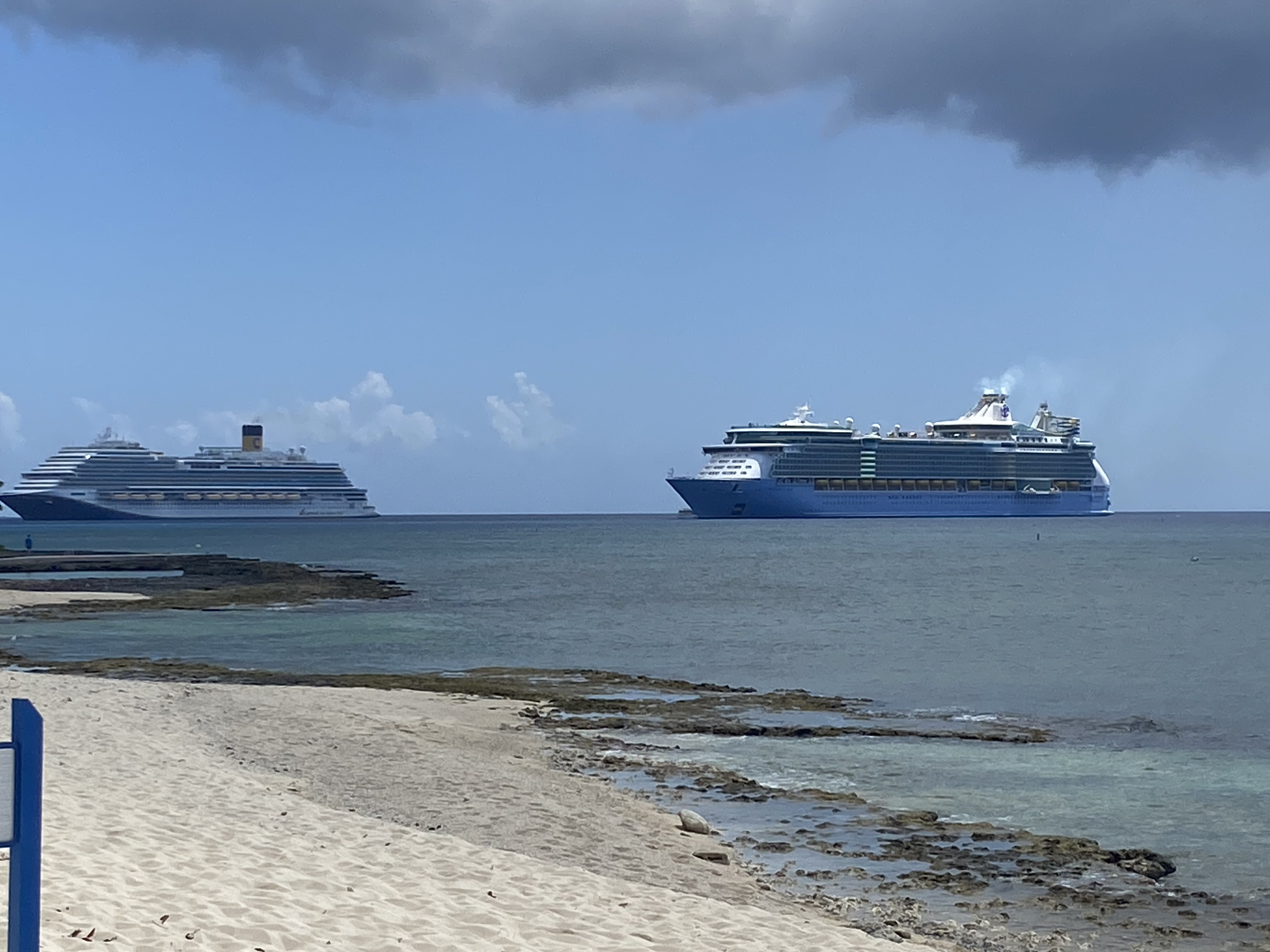
Freedom of the Seas docked next to Carnival Venezia at George Town, Grand Cayman on 24 April 2025

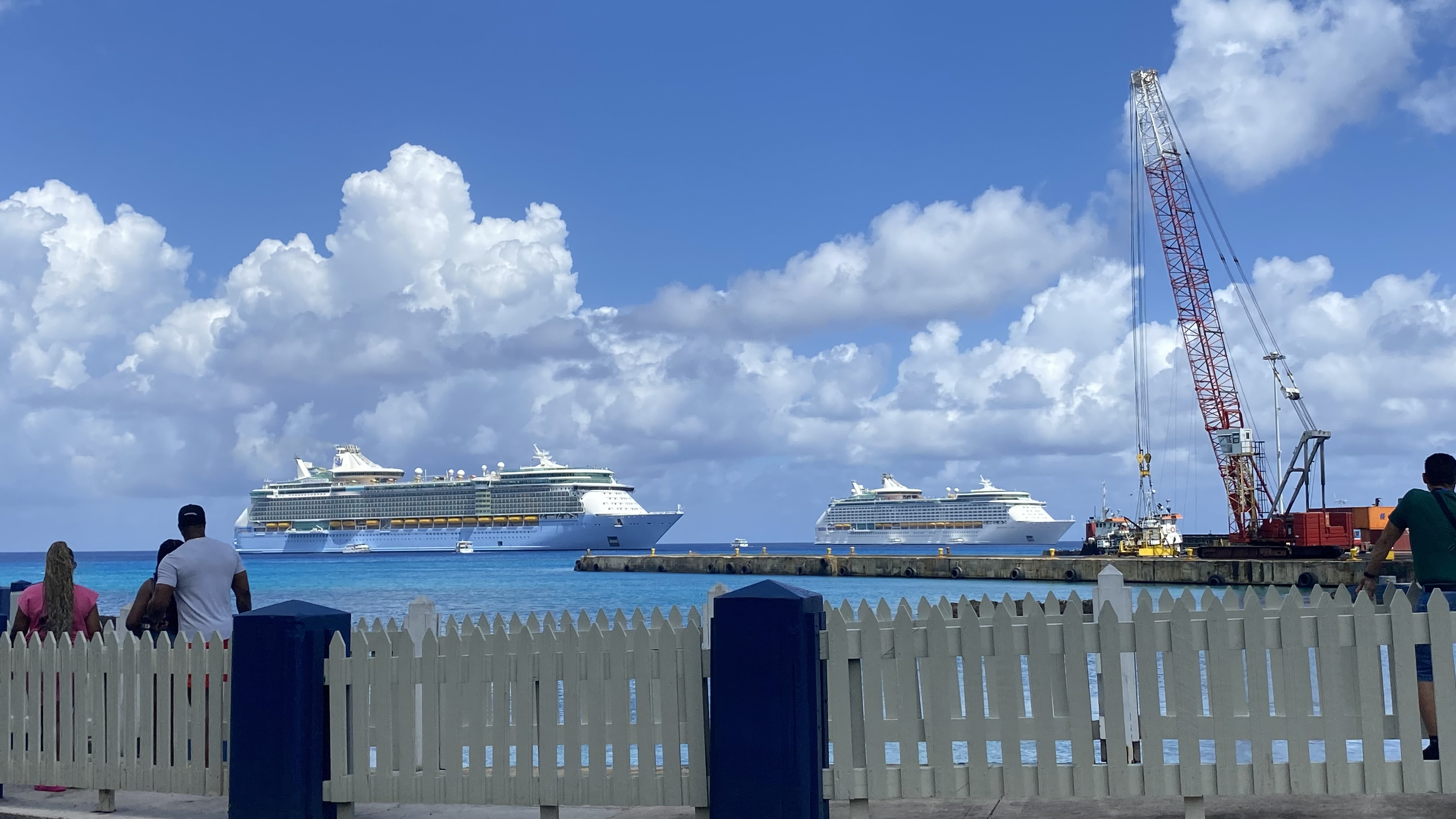
Freedom of the Seas with Adventure of the Seas anchored together at George Town on 28 April 2025
