= Flowriding =

Sport practiced on artificial wave machine

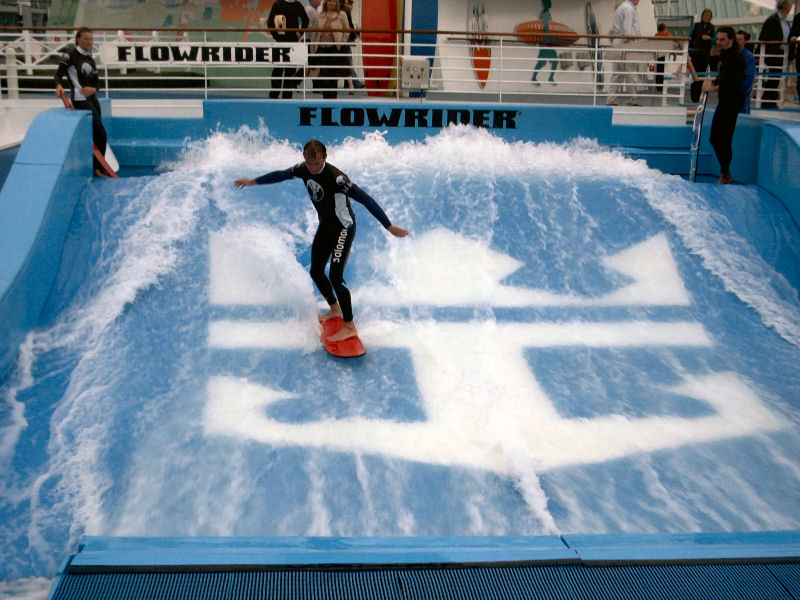
A flow-boarder aboard the Royal Caribbean ship Freedom of the Seas

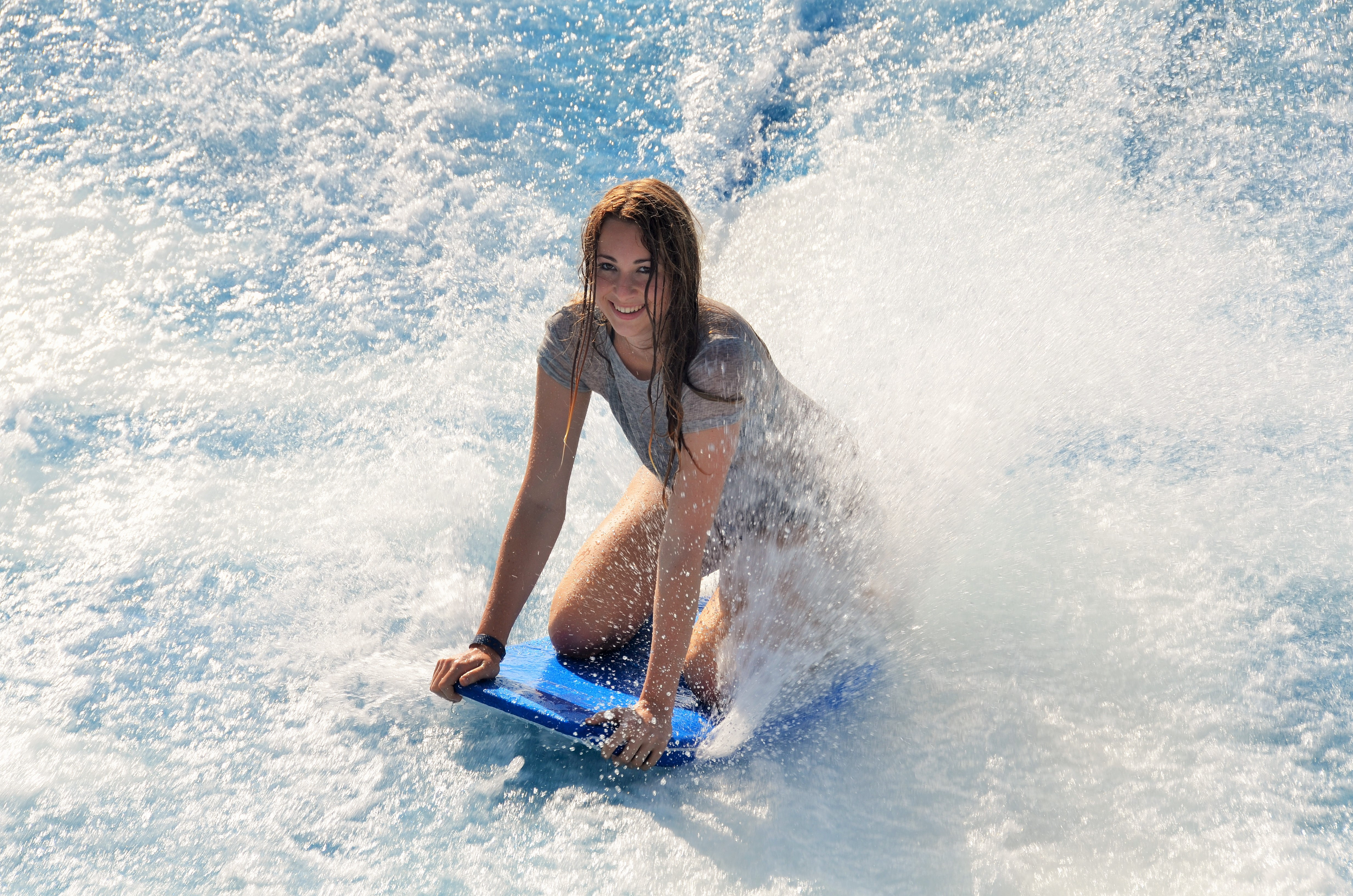
A body-boarder on a Flowrider

Flowriding is a late 20th century alternative boardsport incorporating elements of surfing, bodyboarding, skateboarding, skimboarding, snowboarding and wakeboarding.

The FlowRider and the FlowBarrel are artificial waves that are called "sheet waves". In order to create a sheet wave, water is pumped up and over a surface which is engineered to replicate the shape of an ocean wave. The result is a stationary wave in which a rider can mimic the movements of other board sports, such as moving up and down the wave, carving, and jumping. Since the wave does not move forward, the movement of the rider is derived from the water flowing over the stationary surface.

== History ==
Although the first artificial waves in a pool were developed back in the 19th century by King Ludwig of Bavaria, they required a completely different technology from that of flow riding. The activity of flow riding is closely associated with “FlowRider”, a technology created by Tom Lochtefeld, founder of Wave Loch that shoots more than 410,000 L (108,000 US gal) of water per second, with a speed of 32 km/h to 48 km/h on a padded, inclined surface. At full capacity, 410,000 L (108,000 US gal) of water per minute can amount to waves as high as 1.8 m (6 ft). With this technology, flow riders, those who lie, kneel or stand on a board, attempt to balance on these artificial waves, called sheet waves, and more professional riders seek to perform tricks.

In 1987, Lochtefeld was inspired to create this technology when he observed waters seemingly flowing up a wave in La Jolla. It seemed that the wave was traveling backward. A second inspiration came to him when he saw surfers ride shallow waves without touching the ocean floor. The upward motion of water through a shallow wave then became the essence of the Flowrider, shooting a thin sheet of water up a curved surface. To perfect this design, Lochtefeld hired Carl Ekstrom, known for his surfboard designs, to create the perfect, easy-to-ride, continuous waves. After multiple trials on miniature FlowRiders, in the 1980s, Lochtefeld started testing a FlowRider prototype at Raging Waters water parks. In 1991, the first FlowRider machine was successfully installed at The Schlitterbahn in New Braunfels, Texas. Along with this success, a new type of FlowRider, the “FlowBarrel” was unveiled at Summerland Resort, in Bø, Norway in 1993 and received instant popularity.

In 1999, Lochtefeld secured a contract and investment from Swatch to create the first mobile FlowBarrel, built specifically for a promotional tour. The first event took place in Munich, Germany where Bill Bryan took home the prize as the champion. By 2000, 25 FlowRiders were available around the world, in countries such as Mexico, Japan, South Korea and Germany.

In 2001, the first Wave House venue was established in Durban, South Africa and became the prototype for other venues in the future. 2006 marked the first time when a FlowRider was added on the deck of the Royal Caribbean cruise ship Freedom of the Seas. From then on, every one of Royal Caribbean’s ships has a FlowRider on its sports deck. In 2015, there were in total more than 200 FlowRiders available in 35 countries.

== Wave Design ==
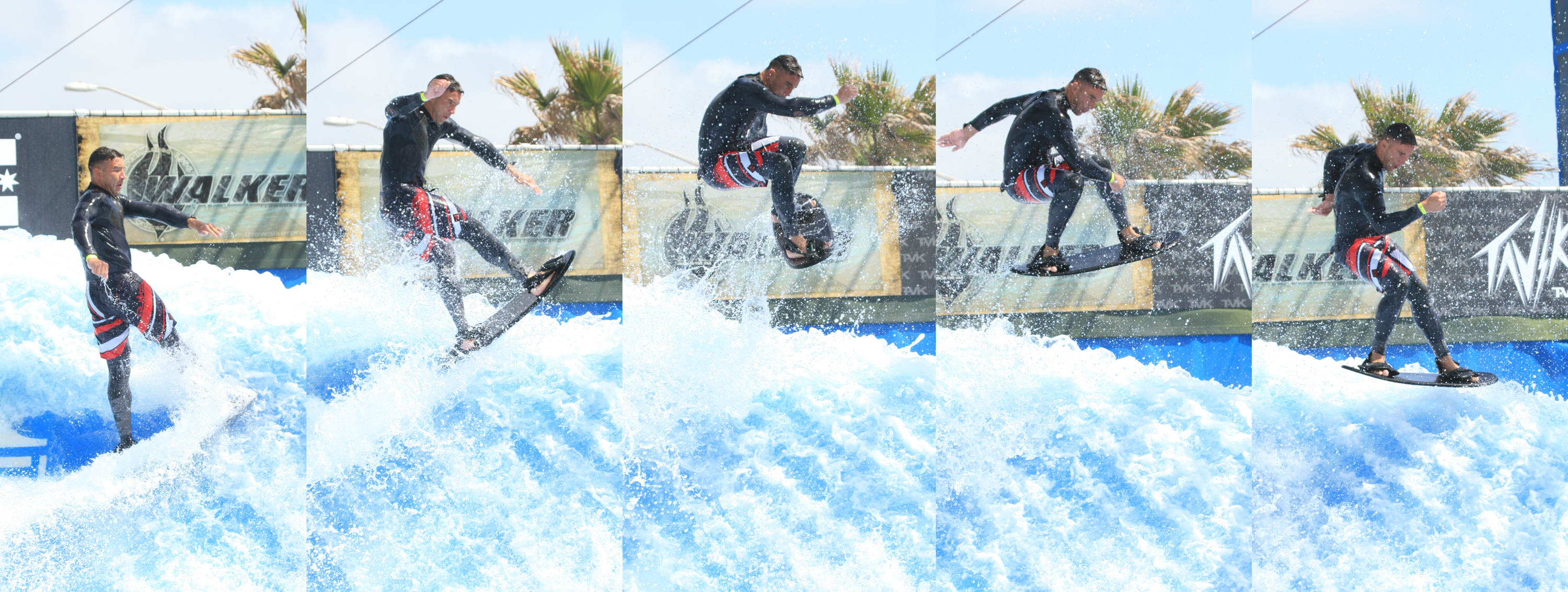
A flowrider performing a trick

There are seven different types of sheet waves that can be used for flowriding however the two main wave structures which are recognized at a competitive level are the FlowRider Single and Double and the FlowBarrel.

The technology made by FlowRider, Inc. grants the ability to simulate different forms of ocean waves. This company is the only one that produced a device that is currently available in the market. At first, the devices were able to provide the simulation of breaking waves. A breaking wave is a wave whose amplitude reached a point where the wave energy is transformed into powerful kinetic energy.

The breaking wave simulation attracts bodyboarders and surfers. Generally, the surfers move in a downward direction as the wave moves forward or they can move relative to the wave and execute certain movements. Flowriders get their speed from the energy of the water flowing at them and can perform basic to sophisticated turns and tricks within a relatively small area. The curved surface of the FlowRider machine matches the actual curvature of a wave, and the curvature changes throughout the surface in order to provide a more realistic wave. The water is then pumped from the bottom up along the curved surface. These pumps project a layer of water at speeds ranging from 32 to 48 km/h (9 to 13 m/s). The biggest difference between the machine and an actual ocean wave, is that the flow rate of the water being pushed along the surface of the FlowRider is much larger than an actual wave. Finally, a vacuum helps keep the riders from skipping dangerously along the surface of the water.

== Board Design ==
The sport has two different types of boards that a rider can choose to ride on. These are the flowboard and the bodyboard.

=== Flowboard ===
The flowboard is also known as the 'stand-up board' in flowriding. Boards differ in shape, materials, lengths and the angle at which the board curves. Generally, they take a similar appearance to that of a wakeboard and can be further categorized into strapped and strapless boards. Boards with foot straps are generally used only on the FlowBarrel, but strapless boards are used on both the FlowRider and FlowBarrel. Flowboards range in length from 90 to 110 cm (35 to 43 in), and in width from 28 to 35 cm (11 to 14 in). They weigh between 1.4 to 2.8 kg (3 to 6 lb).

=== Bodyboard ===
Bodyboarders ride standard bodyboards in the prone, kneeling, or drop-knee position. Each position forms the basis for its own set of tricks. In most competitions, bodyboarders are required to do tricks in both prone and kneeling positions.

== Flowriding League Of the World (FLOW) ==
The Flowriding League of the World (FLOW) which was established in the early 2000s is the main competitive league for flowriders. FLOW breaks up the world tour into sub-tours in the United States, Europe, Asia and Canada. FLOW hosts multiple tour stops in each of these regions in order to give competitors the opportunity to build up enough points to qualify for the World Flowboarding Championships (WFC).

=== World Flowboarding Championships (WFC) ===
Each year FLOW hosts the WFC at a different Wave House around the world. It was held in Utah in 2012 and Singapore in 2016. Within the WFC there are two events: one on the FlowRider wave and one on the FlowBarrel wave. Each Wave House is responsible for finding two men's Flowboarders, one female Flowboarder, and one Bodyboarder to represent their region.

== See also ==
- Ski simulator
