= Voyager of the Seas =

Cruise ship launched in 1998

- Voyager of the Seas at Santorini, Greece in June 2024

History
- Name: Voyager of the Seas
- Owner: Voyager of the Seas Inc.
- Operator: Royal Caribbean International
- Port of registry: 1999–2002: Monrovia, Liberia; 2002–present: Bahamas, Nassau
- Builder: Kværner Masa-Yards, Turku New Shipyard, Turku, Finland
- Cost: US$650 million
- Yard number: 1344
- Laid down: March 31, 1998
- Launched: November 27, 1998
- Sponsored by: Katarina Witt
- Christened: November 20, 1999
- Completed: October 29, 1999
- Maiden voyage: November 21, 1999
- In service: 1999–present
- Identification: ABS class no: Call sign: C6SE5; DNV ID: 19902; IMO number: 9161716; MMSI number: 311317000
- Status: In service

General characteristics
- Class & type: Voyager-class cruise ship
- Tonnage: 137,276 GT; 108,654 NT; 11,132 DWT
- Length: 311.1 m (1,020 ft 8 in)
- Beam: 38.6 m (126 ft 8 in) - Waterline; 47.4 m (155 ft 6 in) - Max
- Height: 63 m (206 ft 8 in)
- Draught: 9.1 m (29 ft 10 in)
- Depth: 24
- Decks: 15
- Deck clearance: 7
- Ramps: 4
- Installed power: 6 × Wärtsilä 12V46 (6 × 12,600 kW (16,900 hp))
- Propulsion: Diesel-electric; 2 × ABB Azipods and 1 × Fixipod; 4 × bow thrusters
- Speed: 23.7 knots (43.9 km/h; 27.3 mph)
- Capacity: 3,602 passengers (double occupancy); 4,000 (maximum occupancy)
- Crew: 1,200

Voyager of the Seas is the lead ship of the Voyager class of cruise ships operated by Royal Caribbean International. Constructed by Kværner Masa-Yards at its Turku New Shipyard in Turku, Finland, she was launched on November 27, 1998, and formally named by two-time gold medal-winning Olympic figure skater Katarina Witt on November 20, 1999.

Royal Caribbean Line announced the suspension of its operations until June 13, 2020, due to the COVID-19 pandemic. On May 26, 2021, the CDC approved RCL to resume operations in June.

== History ==
The ship was constructed in Turku shipyard and completed its construction in November 1998 in Turku New Shipyard, Finland and launched on November 27, 1998, and formally named by Olympic figure skater Katarina Witt on November 20, 1999. Upon her departure on her maiden voyage the following day, November 21, 1999, Voyager of the Seas was the largest cruise ship in the world, although she was overtaken the following year by her sister ship Explorer of the Seas. She measured 137,276 gross tonnage (GT) at launch and following a refit in 2014 her tonnage increased to 138,194 GT. She is 311 m (1,020 ft 4 in) long overall, has a waterline beam of 36.8 m (120 ft 9 in) and a height of 63 m (206 ft 8 in). It can hold 3,602 passengers at double occupancy, and 4,000 passengers maximum.

The investment manager Mario Salcedo began an over 20-year period of living on Royal Caribbean cruise ships after sailing in 2000 on Voyager of the Seas, which impressed him. Salcedo said in a 2016 interview, "It was the biggest cruise ship in the world at the time, and so revolutionary—the first ice skating rink, the first rock climbing wall, so many elements that took cruising to another dimension."

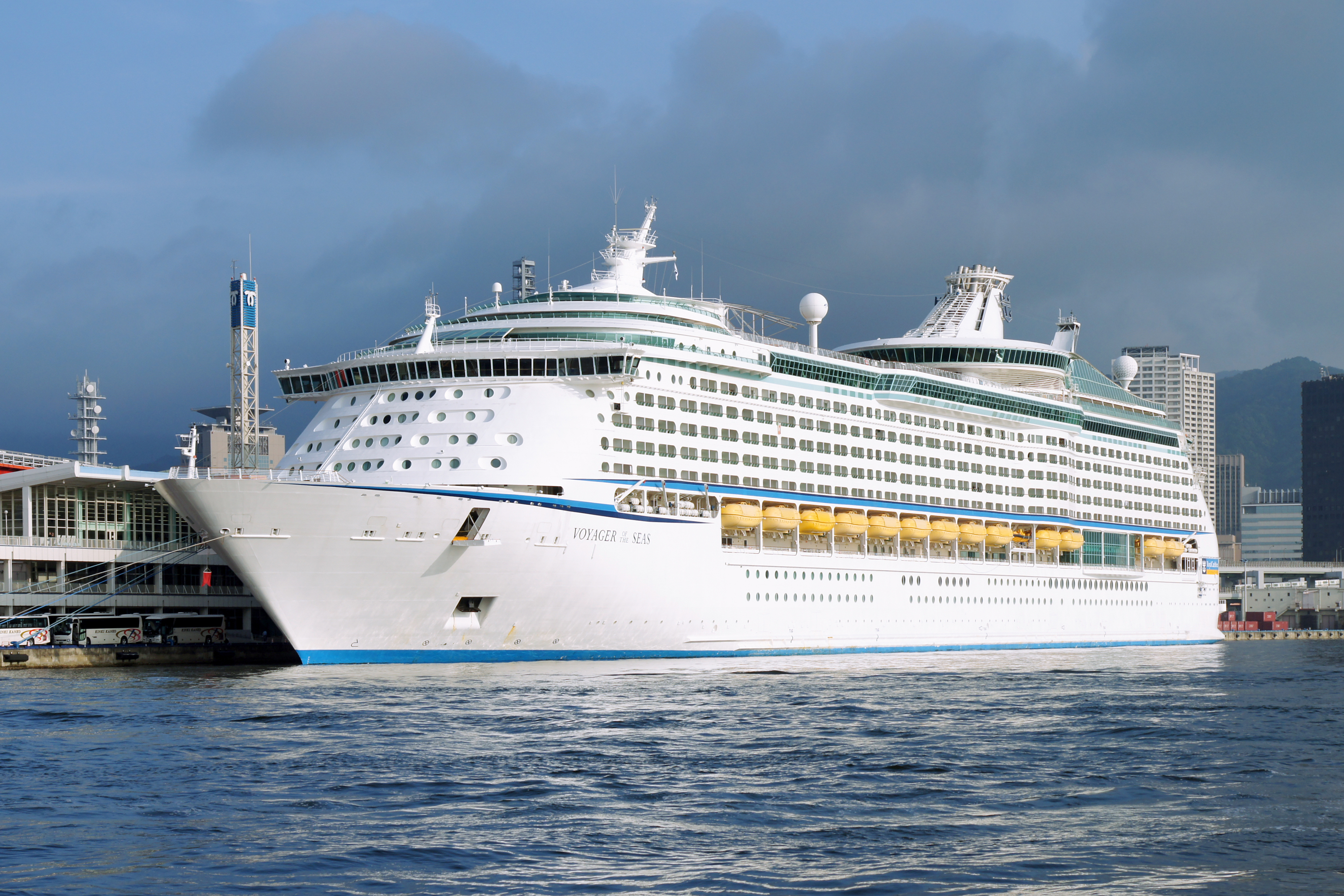
Voyager of the Seas docked in Port of Kobe in Japan on July 10, 2012

== Design ==
Voyager of the Seas included the first rock climbing wall (mounted on the funnel) and the first ice-skating rink at sea. Also, the ship design includes the "Royal Promenade", a large interior space like a street, with restaurants and other amenities. Many windows of interior rooms look out at the promenade. This was a radical feature, never seen before on a large cruise ship.

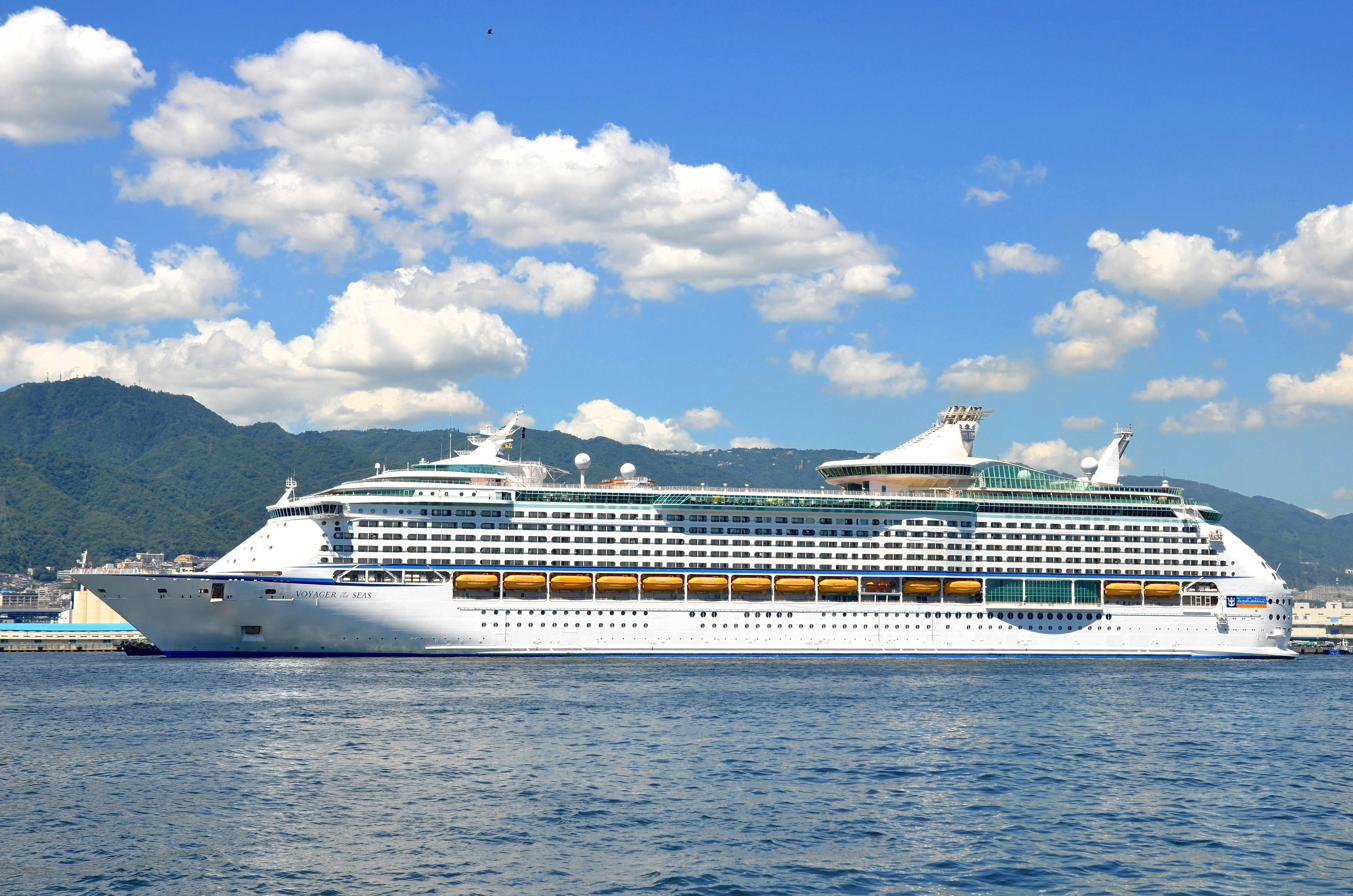
Voyager of the Seas arrived in Port of Kobe also in Japan on March 29, 2013

In October and November 2014, Voyager of the Seas underwent a refit. The modifications included the installation of an outdoor movie screen near the pool and replacing the inline skating track with a flowrider surf simulator.

Voyager of the Seas underwent a US$97 million refit in September 2019 which included the addition of 72 passenger cabins, water slides, and a number of other improvements as part of Royal Caribbean's Royal Amplified initiative.

== Route ==
Voyager of the Seas was chartered for Indian passengers in May 2016. The ship made a maiden call in July 2018, and called the largest cruise ship to call at a Filipino port when it arrived in Manila, Philippines for the first time. It sailed in the Southeast Asia in September 2018 to June 2019, and made a homeport to Sydney at 2019. The ship made a maiden call after it arrived in Bintan Island, Indonesia for the first time. The ship is the first cruise liner visit in 2020, when it berthed at the Port of Lautoka with 3853 passengers. It sailed out of Tokyo, Japan during the summer of 2020, and is set to call in Shanghai in the summer of 2021.

== Media ==
In 2004, Voyager of the Seas arrived in Halifax, Nova Scotia in Canada, Captured in Episode of “Making Waves” from Mighty Machines (Season 2) used her British Accent voiced by Canadian Actress “Patte Rosebank”, and taking a screenshot cover for DVD.

== Incidents ==
In December 2014, many passengers claimed that they were ill and had been diagnosed with whooping cough in the ship; it failed to detect the outbreak during the destination of Singapore to Sydney.

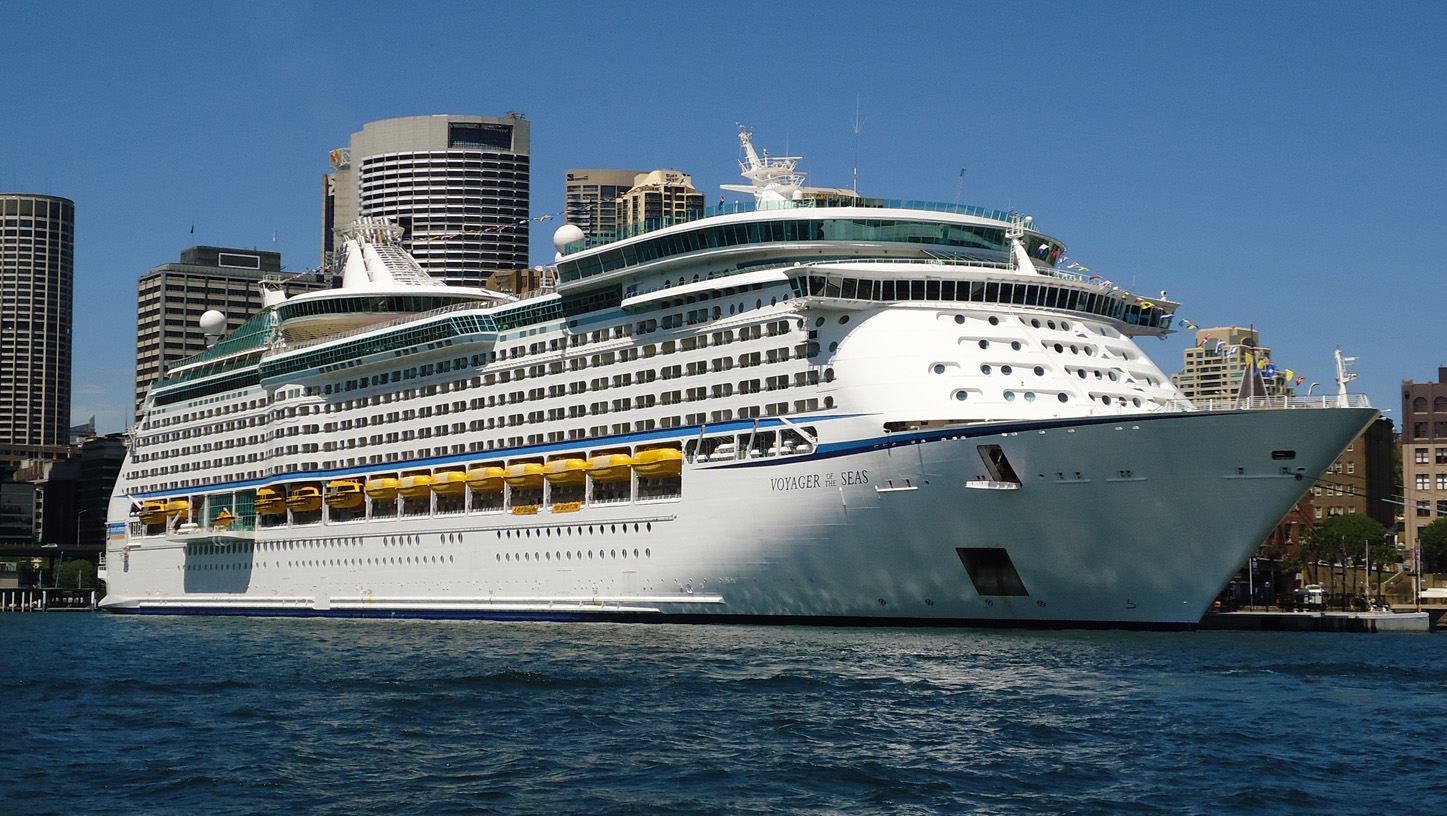
Voyager of the Seas docked in Sydney, Australia on December 8, 2014

In October 2018, the passengers were horrified when 1,300 workers from the Indian tobacco company Kamla Pasand boarded the ship and blocked them from using some facilities.

In May 2019, two male passengers from Singapore died of unrelated natural causes while on board the ship.

=== 2020: spread of COVID-19 ===
Thousands of passengers of cruise ships that disembarked at Sydney, Australia in March 2020 were told to isolate due to COVID-19 fears. Passengers disembarked from Voyager of the Seas on March 18. A Toowoomba, Queensland man was infected on the ship and was sent into intensive care unit of a Toowoomba hospital after disembarking but died. the two cases of outbreak in Tasmania were linked to the ship. On 2 April 34 passengers and 5 crew members had tested positive for the virus in New South Wales alone. On 9 April, Ovation of the Seas transferred its 880 Filipino crew members into Voyager of the Seas to send them back to their country while off the coast of Indonesia, and sailed in Manila, Philippines on April 19. On 23 April, a 79-year-old New Zealand man died from the disease while his wife had also been infected.

=== Storm trouble ===
On January 26, 2024, Voyager of the Seas was impacted by a major storm while sailing in the Gulf of Mexico, the ship listed and passengers experienced flooding inside staterooms and other areas of the ship. Furniture and items were displaced and sustained damage. Some injuries were also reported.

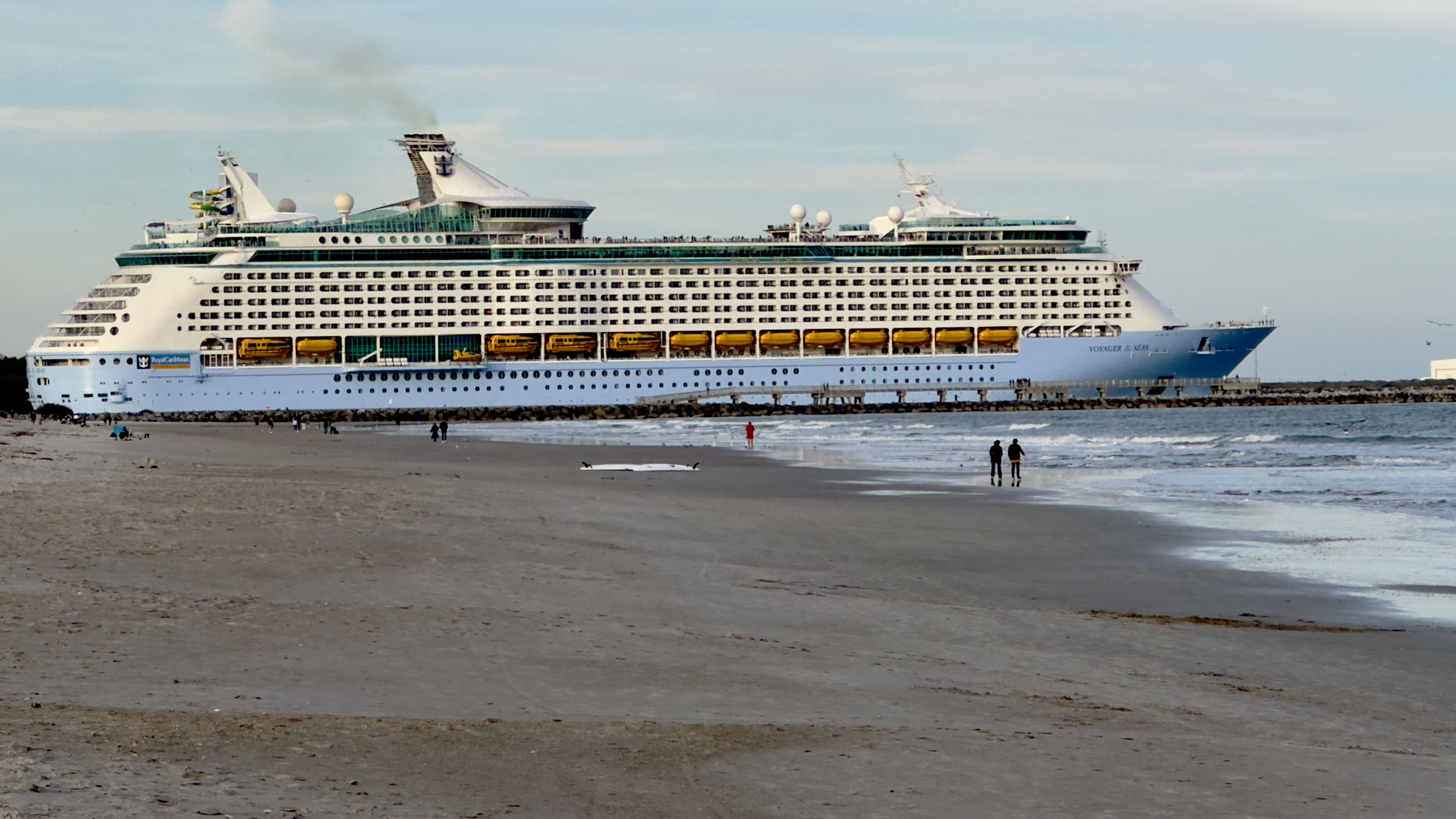
Voyager of the Seas departs Port Canaveral in Florida on January 2, 2025

== Bibliography ==
- Saunders, Aaron (2013). Giants of the Seas: The Ships that Transformed Modern Cruising. Barnsley, England: Seaforth Publishing. ISBN 9781848321724.
- Smith, Peter C. (2010). Cruise Ships: The World's Most Luxurious Vessels. Barnsley, South Yorkshire, UK: Pen & Sword Maritime. ISBN 9781848842182.
