= Sister ship =

Ship of the same class or design as another

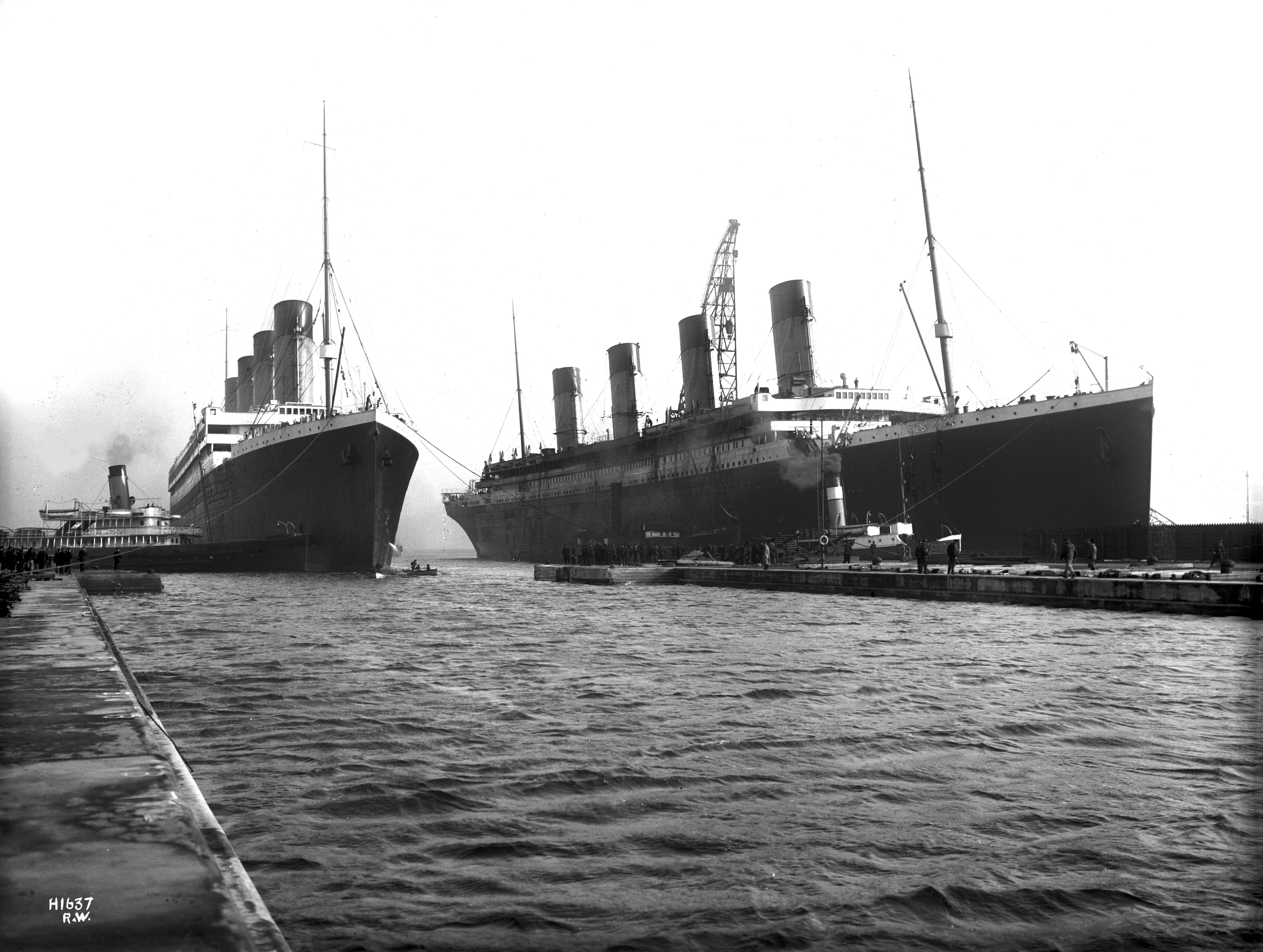
The sister ships RMS Olympic and RMS Titanic at Belfast on 6 March 1912

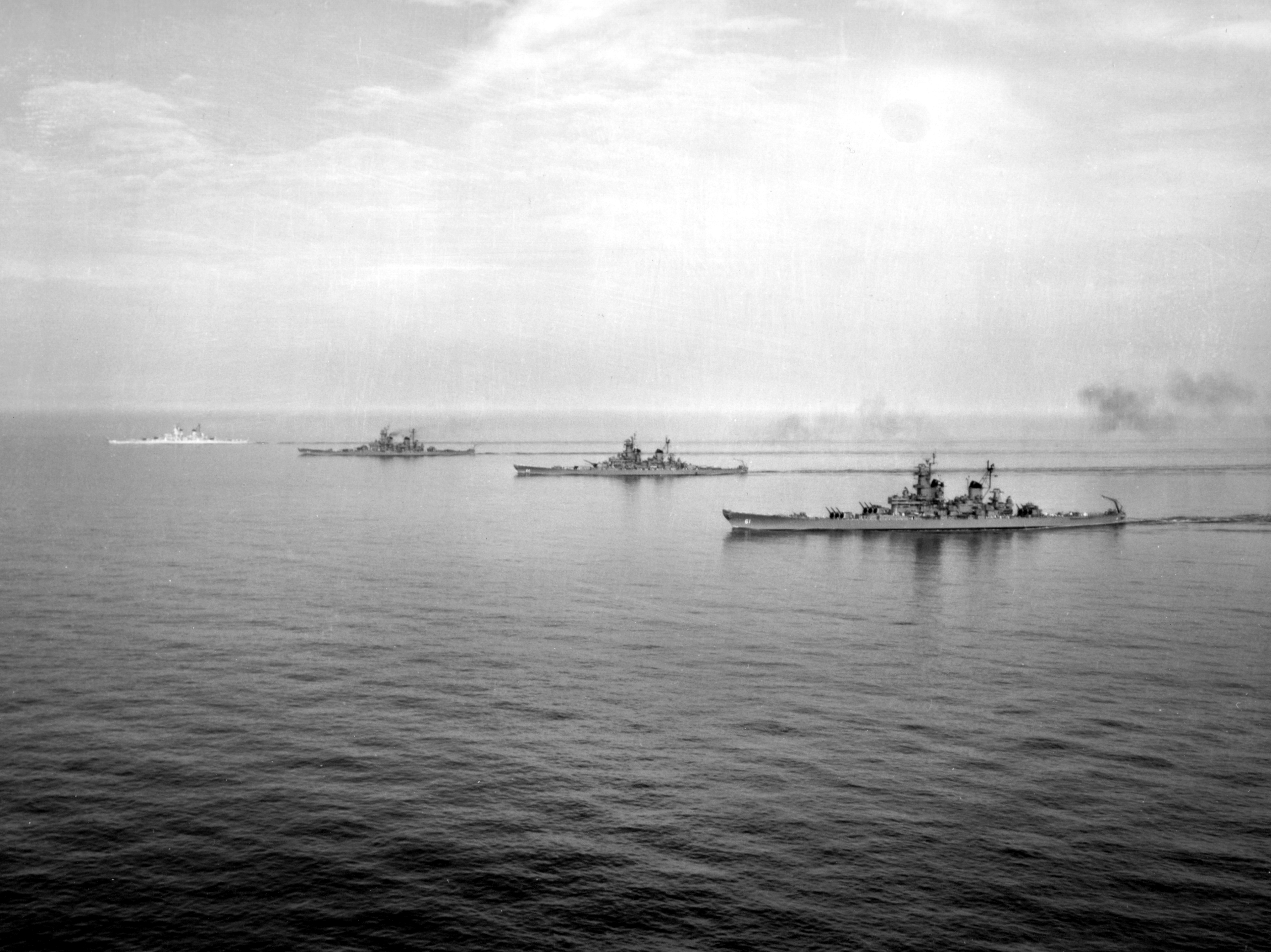
The four Iowa-class battleships off the Virginia Capes on 7 June 1954; from front to back is USS Iowa, USS Wisconsin, USS Missouri and USS New Jersey

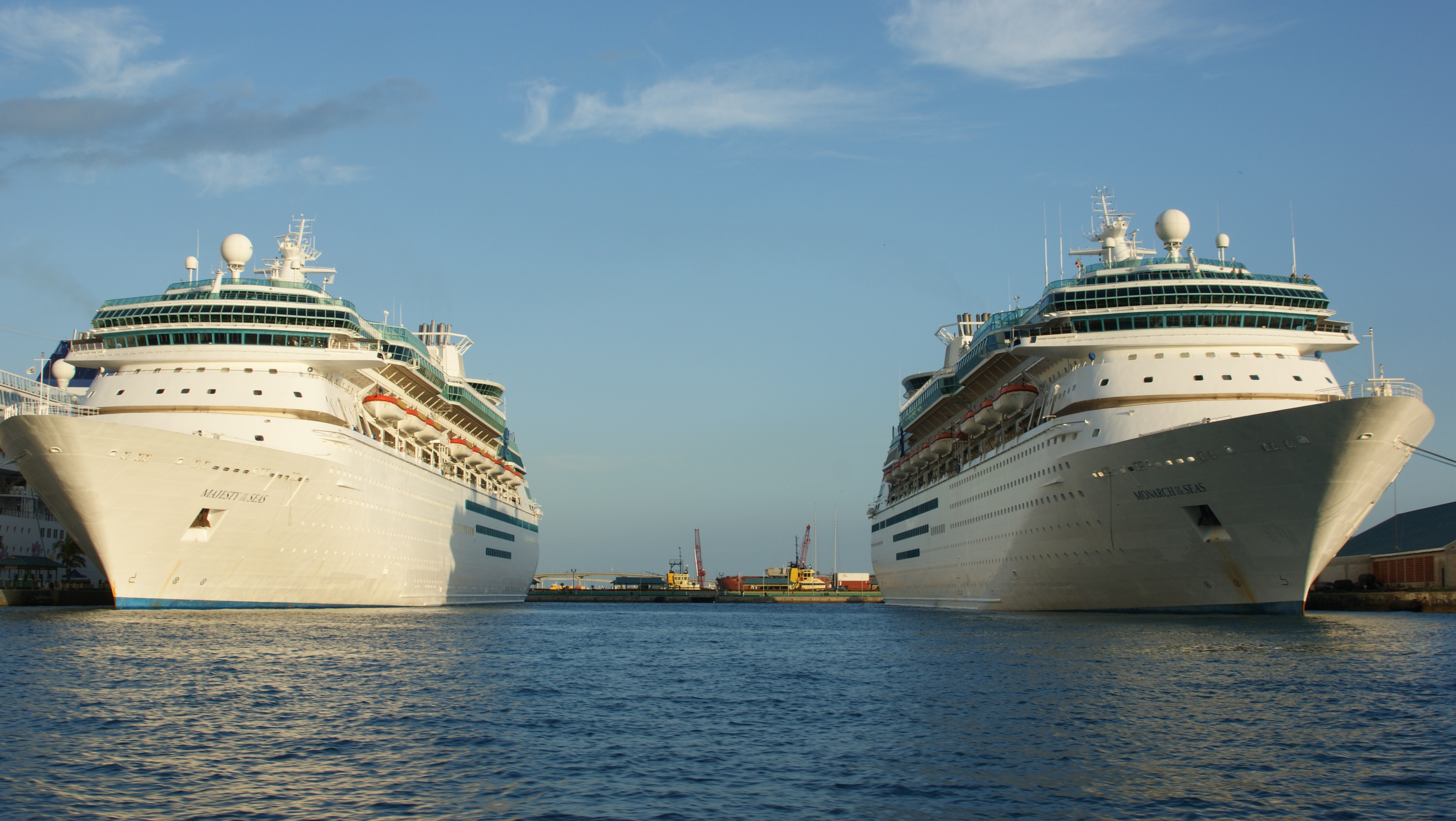
The sister ships Majesty of the Seas and Monarch of the Seas in Nassau, Bahamas in 2011

A sister ship is a ship of the same class or of virtually identical design to another ship. Such vessels share a nearly identical hull and superstructure layout, similar size, and roughly comparable features and equipment.

They often share a common naming theme, either being named after the same type of thing or person (places, constellations, heads of state) or with some kind of alliteration. Typically the ship class is named for the first ship of that class. Often, sisters become more differentiated during their service as their equipment (in the case of naval vessels, their armament) are separately altered.

For instance, the U.S. warships USS Iowa, USS New Jersey, USS Missouri and USS Wisconsin are all sister ships, each being an Iowa-class battleship.

A notable group of sister ships were the White Star Line's Olympic-class ocean liners trio, consisting of RMS Olympic, RMS Titanic, and HMHS Britannic. As with some other liners, the sisters worked as running mates. Of the three sister ships, Titanic and Britannic would both sink within a year of being launched, while RMS Olympic's career spanned 24 years. Other sister ships include the Royal Caribbean International's Explorer of the Seas and Adventure of the Seas.

Half-sister refers to a ship of the same class but with some significant differences. One example of half-sisters are the First World War-era British Courageous-class battlecruisers where the first two ships had four 15-inch (381 mm) guns, but the last ship, HMS Furious, had two 18-inch (457 mm) guns instead. All three were converted into aircraft carriers, with Furious again differing from her half-sisters by initially being flush-decked and later by having a much smaller island. Another example is the American Essex-class aircraft carriers of the Second World War that came in "long-hull" and "short-hull" versions.

Notable airships include the American sister ships USS Akron and USS Macon, and the German Hindenburg-class airship's Hindenburg and Graf Zeppelin II.

The generally accepted commercial distinctions of a "sister ship" are the following:

- Type: Identical main type (bulk, tank, RoRo, etc.)
- Builder: Identical shipbuilding company name (not the ship yard location or the country of build)
- Deadweight tonnage (DWT): ± 10% on the DWT (If the ship is 100,000 DWT, 90,000 to 110,000 DWT)

The critical overriding criterion is having the same hull design. For example, the popular TESS-57 standard design built by Tsuneishi Shipbuilding are built in Japan, China, and the Philippines. All the ships of this design are classed as sister ships.

The International Maritime Organization defined sister ship in IMO resolution MSC/Circ.1158 in 2006. Criteria included these:

- A sister ship is a ship built by the same yard from the same plans.
- The acceptable deviation of lightship displacement should be between 1 and 2% of the lightship displacement of the lead ship, depending on the length of the ship.
