= Explorer of the Seas =

Voyager-class cruise ship operated by Royal Caribbean International

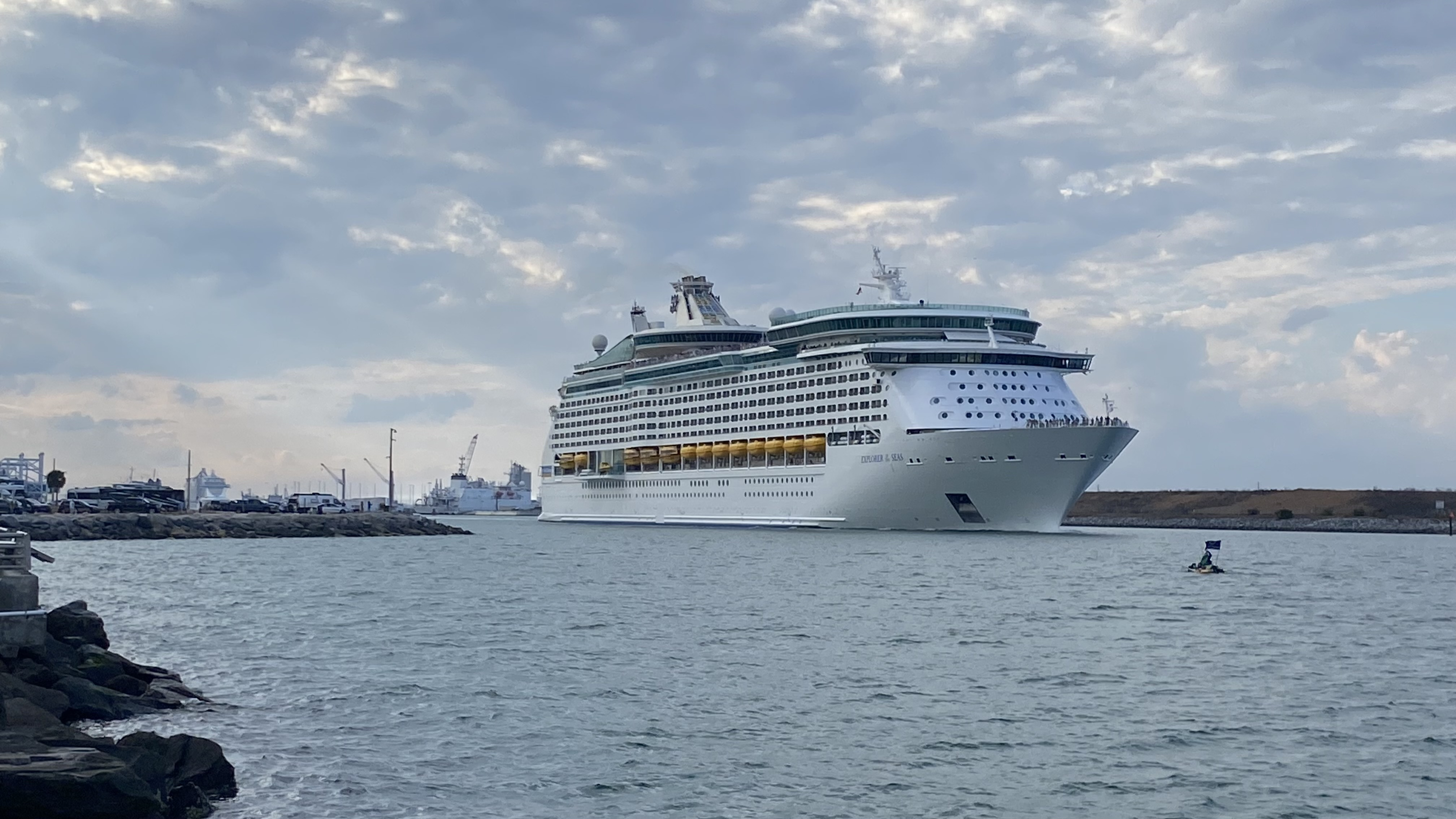
- Explorer of the Seas departs Port Canaveral in Florida on 12 February 2026

History

Bahamas
- Name: Explorer of the Seas
- Owner: Royal Caribbean Group; Explorer of the Seas Inc.
- Operator: Royal Caribbean International
- Port of registry: 2000–2002: Monrovia, Liberia; 2002 onwards: Nassau, Bahamas
- Route: Caribbean & Mediterranean
- Builder: Kværner Masa-Yards Turku New Shipyard, Finland
- Yard number: 1345
- Laid down: 15 June 1998
- Launched: 4 November 1999
- Christened: 21 October 2000
- Completed: 28 September 2000
- Maiden voyage: 28 October 2000
- In service: 2000–present
- Identification: Call sign: C6SE4; DNV ID: 19903; IMO number: 9161728; MMSI number: 311316000
- Status: In service

General characteristics
- Class & type: Voyager-class cruise ship
- Tonnage: 138,194 GT; 108,654 NT; 11,000 DWT
- Length: 311 m (1,020 ft 4 in)
- Beam: 38.6 m (126 ft 8 in) - Waterline; 49.1 m (161 ft 1 in) - Max
- Height: 63 m (206 ft 8 in)
- Draught: 8.3 m (27 ft 3 in)
- Depth: 11.7 m (38 ft 5 in)
- Decks: 15
- Deck clearance: 3,400 m (11,154 ft 10 in)
- Installed power: 6 × Wärtsilä 12V46 (6 × 12,600 kW (16,900 hp))
- Propulsion: Diesel-electric; Two ABB Azipods and one Fixipod; Four bow thrusters
- Speed: 23.7 knots (43.9 km/h; 27.3 mph)
- Capacity: 3,286 passengers (double occupancy), 4,290 (maximum)
- Crew: 1,180

Explorer of the Seas is a Voyager-class cruise ship owned and operated by Royal Caribbean International, completed in 2000. She can accommodate over 3,000 guests, including scientists making use of a built-in atmospheric and oceanographic laboratory operated by the University of Miami's Rosenstiel School of Marine, Atmospheric, and Earth Science. The lab, with its attendant educational and outreach programs for passengers, was discontinued in 2007.

== History ==
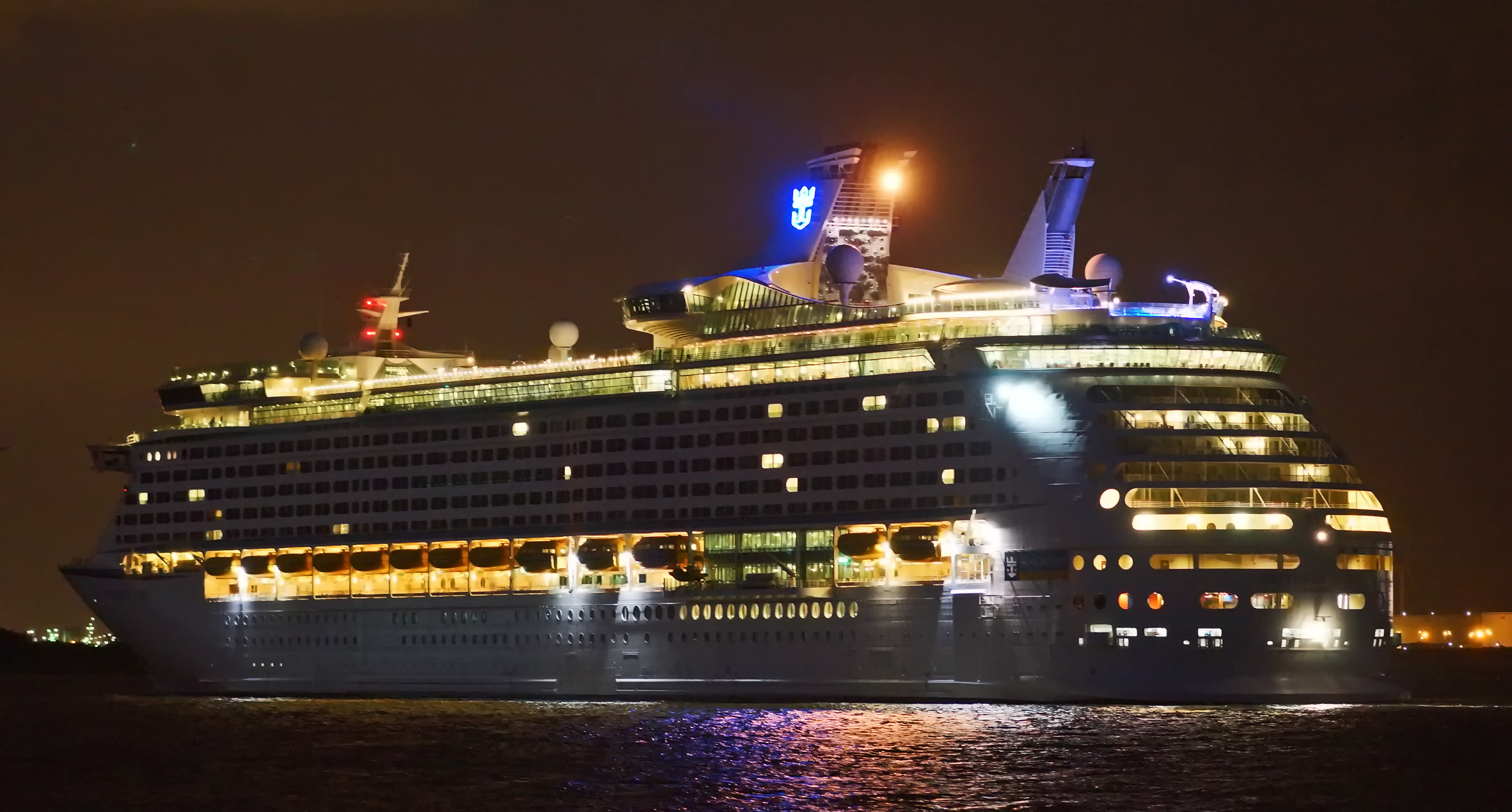
Explorer of the Seas at Nieuwe Waterweg in 2015

The Explorer of the Seas was completed in 2000 and has the capacity of 3,000 passengers. An automated system for gathering data was installed in 2008.) At launch, Explorer of the Seas had a tonnage of 137,308 GT, exceeding that of her sister ship Voyager of the Seas by 32 GT and making her the world's largest passenger ship. She held that record until being overtaken by Navigator of the Seas in 2002. In early 2015, Explorer of the Seas received major upgrades, including the replacement of the inline skating rink with a Flowrider surfing simulator and increasing her tonnage to 138,194 GT. The ship's godmother is American athlete Jackie Joyner-Kersee.

In September 2019 , it was announced that the ship will get a refurbishment with $110 million in makeovers before its 2020 summer season. The refurbishment that was to take place under the amplification program in 2020 was delayed indefinitely due to the COVID-19 pandemic, instead only a technical refurbishment took place.

In July 2021, the ship was used to house some rescue workers and other officials involved in the rescue and recovery effort of the Surfside condominium building collapse.

== Ports of call ==
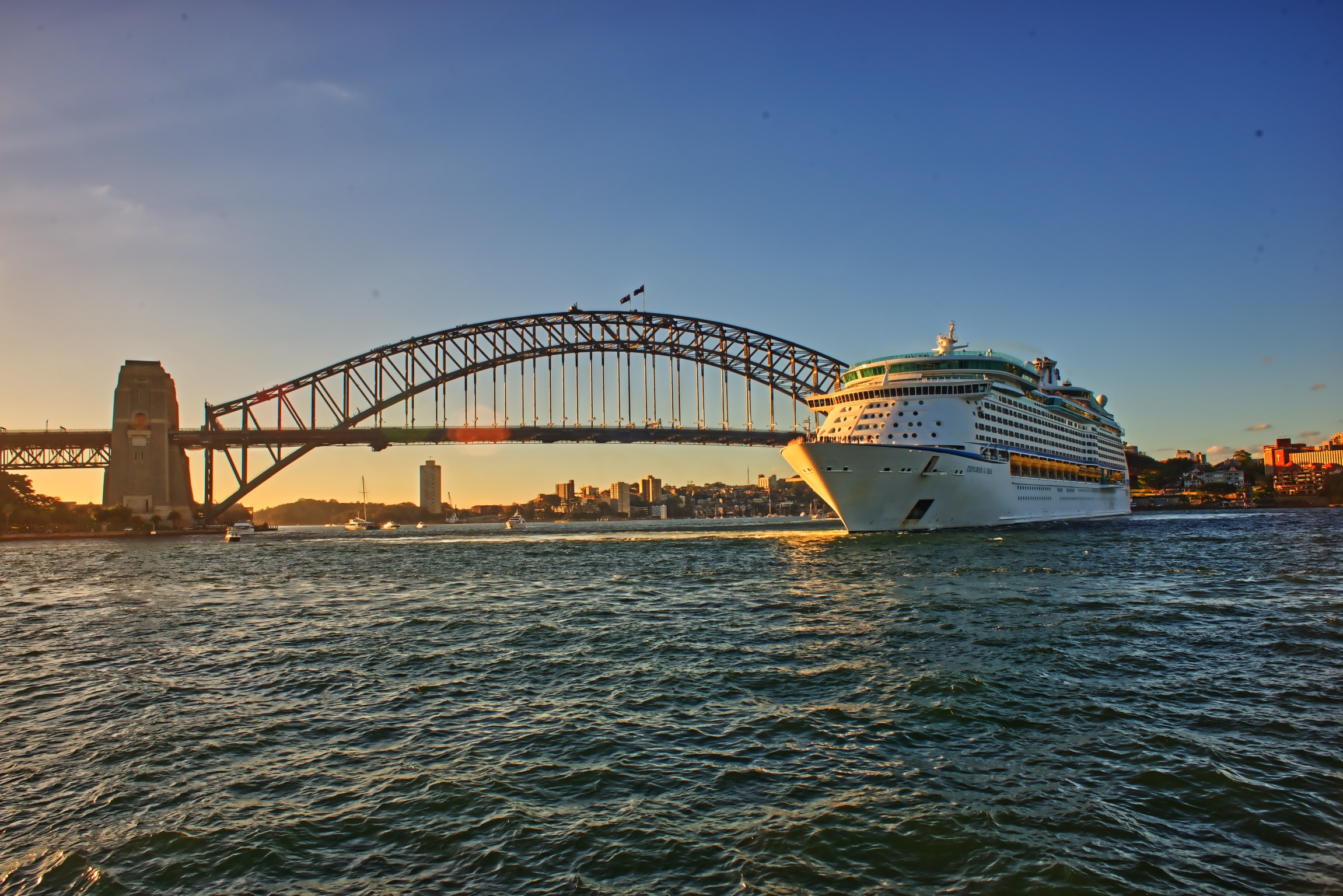
Explorer of the Seas visiting Sydney Harbour

In fall 2014, she sailed 5 to 9-day Caribbean cruises out of Port Canaveral, Florida. After dry-dock refurbishment in the spring of 2015, Explorer of the Seas began to sail Northern Europe, Mediterranean, and Madeira, Azores and Canary Islands itineraries out of Southampton, Hampshire, United Kingdom.

From November 2015 to 23 April 2016, Explorer of the Seas was based in Sydney, Australia, for the summer cruise season. A 24-day cruise relocated the ship to Seattle for the summer 2016 season. In January 2019, the ship brought 4,000 passengers to Wollongong.

== Accidents and incidents ==
=== Rescue of Tumbleweed ===
On 16 February 2008, while en route from Bayonne, New Jersey, on a nine-day cruise to the Caribbean the bridge crew heard a faint mayday call over the radio. This turned out to be the crew from Tumbleweed, a 39-foot (12 m) sailing vessel, which had a planned sail from Baltimore to the Florida Keys. The crew reportedly had a mechanical breakdown of both engine and sails. The vessel drifted for 11 days to the location N32.35 W 72.49–roughly 275 miles (443 km) southeast of North Carolina. Explorer of the Seas located and rescued the three men, who then departed the ship in Puerto Rico on 21 February 2008.

=== Crew overboard ===
On 5 May 2010, a crewmember was caught on surveillance jumping overboard. The ship turned around to rescue him but was unable to locate the crewmember.

=== Norwegian Star collision ===
On 14 September 2012, Explorer of the Seas was moored in Bermuda when heavy winds pushed Norwegian Cruise Line's Norwegian Star at its stern. Neither ship suffered any significant damage.

=== Norovirus outbreak ===
On 24 January 2014, 281 passengers and 22 crew members aboard Explorer of the Seas fell ill, reporting symptoms of vomiting and diarrhea. Due to the number of passengers sick, the Centers for Disease Control and Prevention sent a Sanitation Program Officer and an epidemiologist to the ship on Sunday, 26 January 2014, when it was docked in St. Thomas. By 27 January 2014 the number of ill increased to 564 passengers and 47 crew members and a decision was made to end the cruise early. After Explorer of the Seas returned to port, 684 of the 4,237 aboard had symptoms of norovirus.

=== Gastro outbreak ===
On 16 December 2015, A total of 182 passengers out of the 3,566 on board Explorer of the Seas contracted infectious diarrhea. The ship's operator contacted South Eastern Sydney Local Health District before arriving in Sydney at 6am. None of the passengers were taken to hospital. It was also on this cruise that all of the passengers on board experienced a freak storm on 15 December 2015. During this storm the ship experienced a crosswind of 150 knots (280 km/h; 170 mph) and the ship listed to the port side by 10 degrees.

On 4 November 2019, the ship was forced to delay her arrival back in Southampton due to the heavy storms battering Western Europe.

=== Coronavirus pandemic ===
During the COVID-19 pandemic, the Centers for Disease Control and Prevention (CDC) reported that at least one passenger had tested positive for severe acute respiratory syndrome coronavirus 2 within 14 days of disembarking from the ship on its voyage from 8 to 15 March 2020.

=== Surfside search and rescue ===
After the June 2021 Surfside condominium collapse, Explorer of the Seas was moored nearby to host nearly 600 search and rescue personnel assisting with the incident.

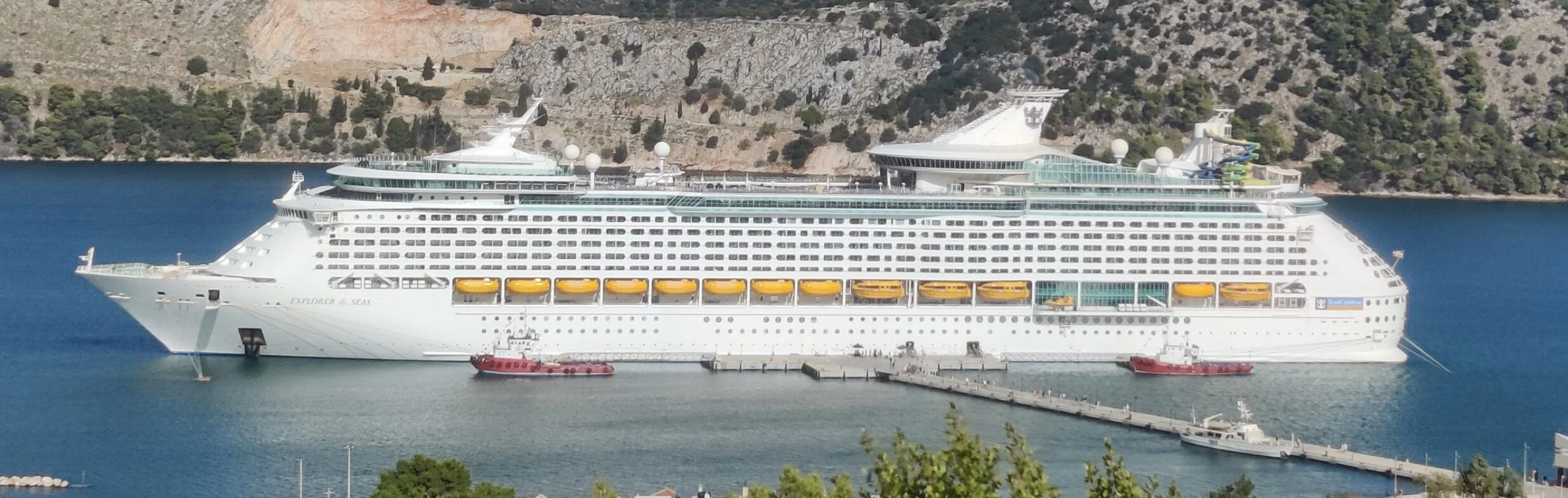
Explorer of the Seas docked at Argostoli, Greece in 2023

=== Passenger overboard ===
On 9 August 2024, an unnamed passenger from the United Kingdom fell overboard as the ship traveled from Santorini, Greece to Zadar, Croatia. Search efforts commenced, with the Croatian Coast Guard assisting, and a planned stop in Zadar was cancelled. The search was called off after four days.

=== Storm troubles ===
On 7 November 2024, a storm affected the ship near the Canary Islands, causing a 14.5º heel, some injuries and material damage.

=== Passenger overboard ===
On 2 March 2025, a female passenger went overboard on the first day of a themed "The 80s Cruise" traveling from Miami to Nassau, Bahamas. The ship stopped for search and rescue, but resumed course several hours later while the Coast Guard continued search and recovery efforts.
