= Voyager-class cruise ship =

Class of cruise ships owned by Royal Caribbean International

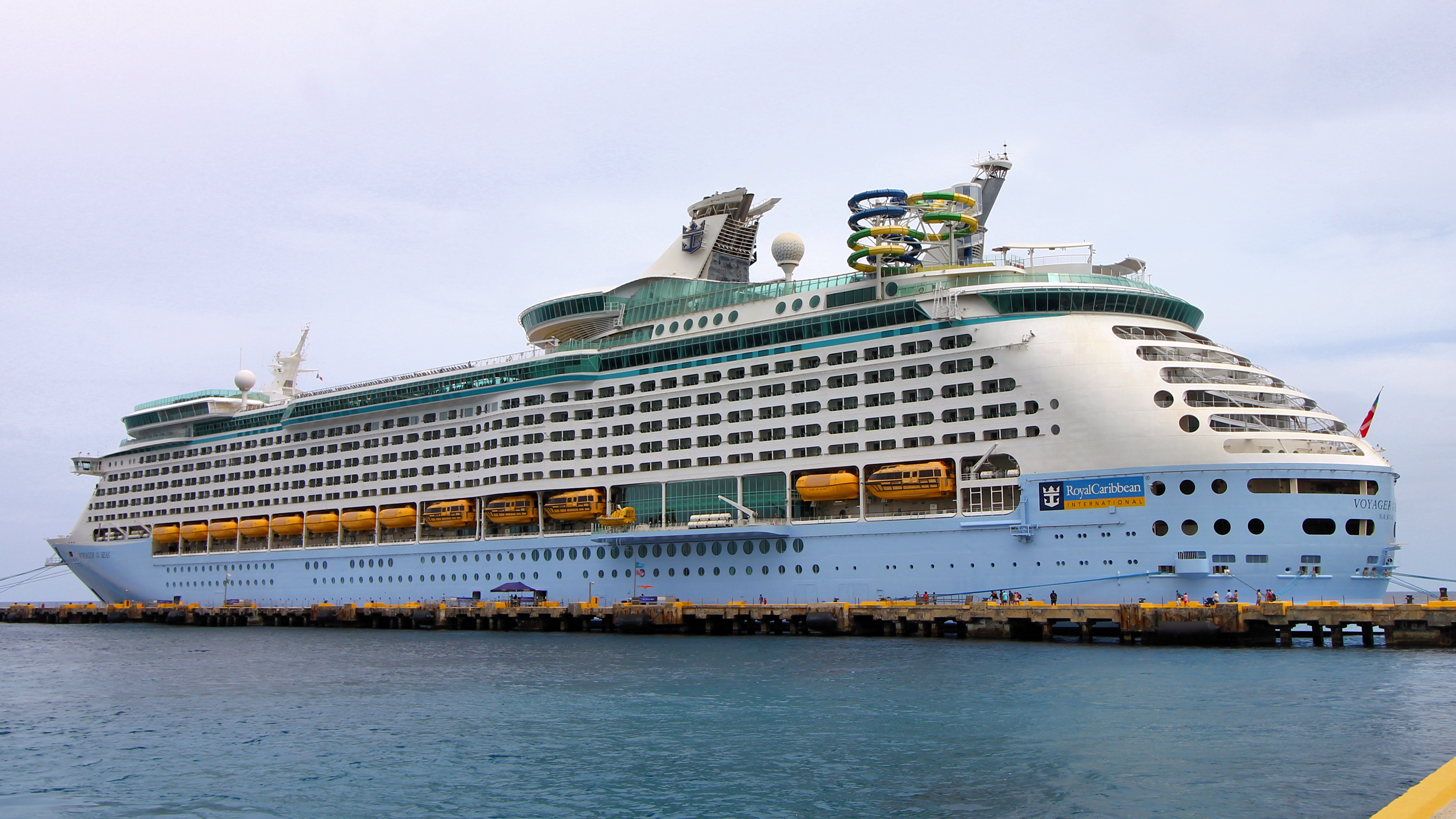
- Lead ship, Voyager of the Seas docked at Costa Maya, Mexico, on 23 August 2023

Class overview
- Builders: Kværner Masa-Yards Turku New Shipyard, Finland
- Operators: Royal Caribbean International
- Preceded by: Vision class
- Succeeded by: Freedom class; Radiance class
- Built: 1998–2003
- Planned: 5
- Completed: 5
- Active: 5

General characteristics
- Type: Cruise ship
- Tonnage: 138,000 GT
- Displacement: 68,000 tons
- Length: 311.32 m (1,021.40 ft)
- Beam: 48.01 m (157.50 ft)
- Draft: 8.8 m (29 ft)
- Decks: 15
- Speed: 22 knots (41 km/h; 25 mph)
- Capacity: 3,114 passengers
- Crew: 1,185

The Voyager class refers to a design of post-Panamax cruise ships owned and operated by Royal Caribbean International. The Voyager-class ships were built at Kværner Masa-Yards Turku New Shipyard, Finland.

There are two generations of Voyager-class ship which feature slight differences in design. The first generation ships, Voyager of the Seas, Explorer of the Seas and Adventure of the Seas, were launched between 1999 and 2001. The second generation ships Navigator of the Seas and Mariner of the Seas were launched in 2002 and 2003 respectively.

== History ==
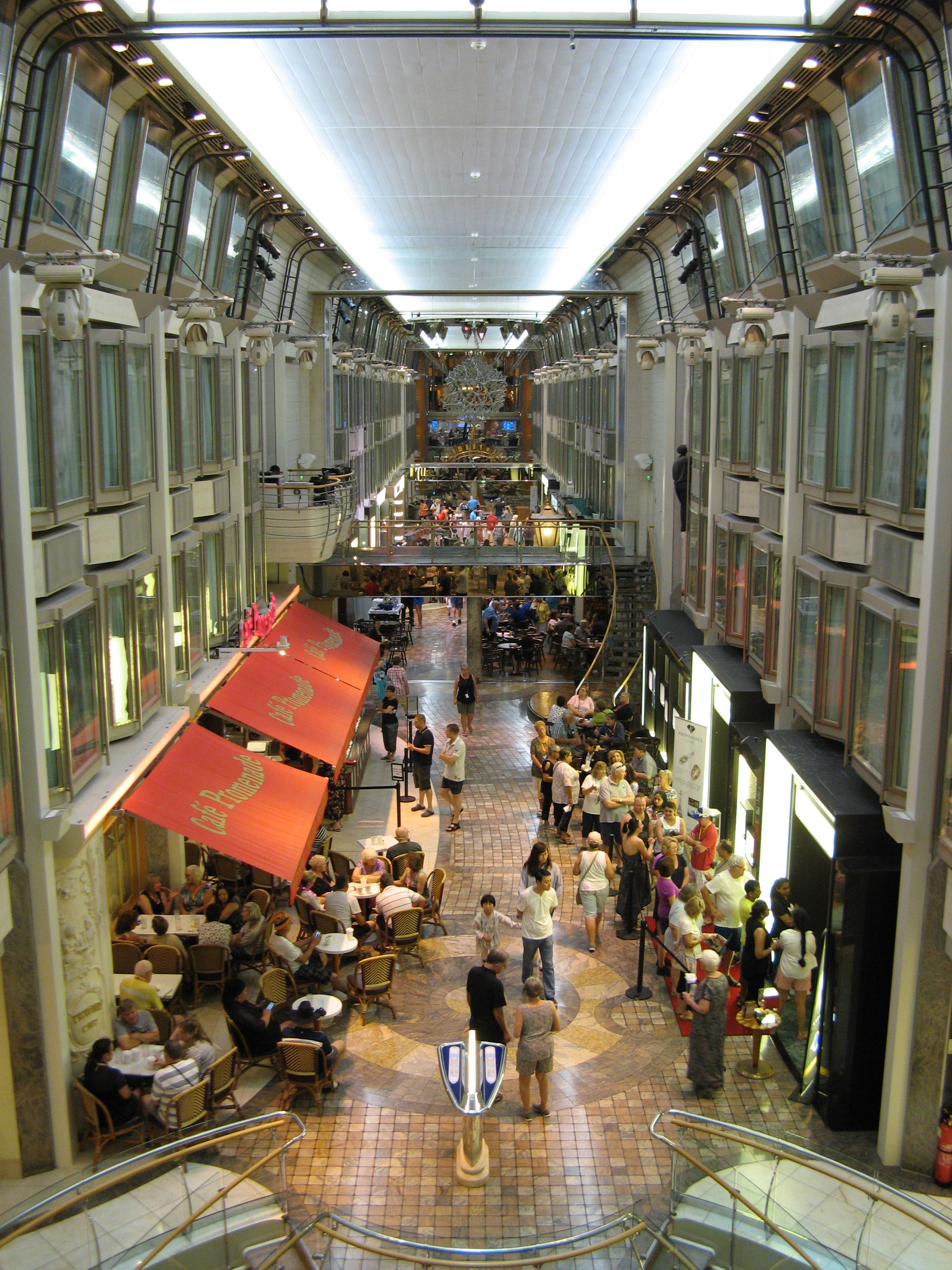
Voyager was the first class to feature the Royal Promenade

The Voyager class was named Project Eagle prior to launch. The project began in 1995 after a series of marketing studies. Eagle aimed to attract cruisers who did not consider themselves "cruise ship people".

Voyager of the Seas was the first of Royal Caribbean's ships to feature a large open space in the centre of the ship known as the Royal Promenade, which has become a staple of future Royal Caribbean International ships, as well as being adopted by other cruise lines in various forms. The Royal Promenade was inspired by Harri Kulovaara, who was VP of Quality Assurance at RCI in the 1990s, who designed a similar feature on a Silja Lines ferry.

== Design ==
Voyager-class ships have a diesel-electric powertrain. They are powered by six Wärtsilä 46 diesel engines, giving a total output of 75,600 kilowatts (101,400 hp). The generated electric power supplies power to the 14 megawatt ABB Azipod azimuth thrusters (two steerable and one fixed).

The Voyager class featured some world firsts for cruise ships when it debuted, including the first rock climbing wall (mounted on the funnel) and ice-skating rink at sea.

The class' architecture was assigned to different architects and firms, some of which had no previous cruise ship experience. For example, the 1,350-seat La Scala Theatre on Voyager of the seas was designed by architect Wilson Butler Lodge, inspired by the Milan Opera House and bringing cruise-first features of Broadway theatres. This is the first time Royal Caribbean used theatre planning and design consultants for its onboard theatres.

=== First and second generations ===
The first and second generations of the Voyager class differ slightly in design. Navigator of the Seas introduced wider glass balconies to the class. A number of public venues were changed, such as the retirement of the Aquarium Bar, Sports Bar and Island Grill and the introduction of Bolero's Bar, Vintages wine bar, Portofino, Chops Grille, Jade and the Plaza. The youth and teen areas were also reconfigured, the newer ships removing the children's pool area at the aft of the ship.

== Modification history ==
In 2012, Mariner of the Seas was modified to include an outdoor movie screen and new passenger lounges. These same changes were made to Adventure of the Seas in 2014. Navigator of the Seas, Voyager of the Seas, and Explorer of the Seas replaced their inline skating tracks with Flowrider surf simulators in 2014 and 2015.

== Ships ==
Ship	Year Built	Entered service with Royal Caribbean	Gross tonnage	Notes	Image
First generation
Voyager of the Seas	1999	21 November 1999	138,194	Voyager of the Seas was the largest cruise ship in the world when built, was the first ship to have an ice rink at sea. She received a flowrider and new staterooms during an April 2015 drydock refurbishment.	
Explorer of the Seas	2000	28 October 2000	138,194	Has built-in atmospheric and oceanographic laboratory operated by the University of Miami's Rosenstiel School of Marine and Atmospheric Science. She received a flowrider and 86 new staterooms during an April 2015 drydock refurbishment.	
Adventure of the Seas	2001	18 November 2001	137,276	Refitted in 2014 and received a water park and flowrider in December 2016.	
Second generation
Navigator of the Seas	2002	14 December 2002	139,570	First of the second generation of Voyager-class vessels. Received a flowrider and 81 new staterooms in a January 2014 drydock refurbishment and was again refurbished in February 2019 and March 2024.	
Mariner of the Seas	2003	16 November 2003	139,863	Refurbished in April 2012. Received a virtual reality bungee trampoline, waterslides, and a flowrider in a 2018 refurbishment. She was refurbished again in March 2023.	
