= Flow Rider =

Flow Rider may refer to:

- Flo Rida, an American rapper
- A participant in the water sport of flowriding
- A water ride developed by Wave Loch for flowriding
