= Navigator of the Seas =

Cruise ship

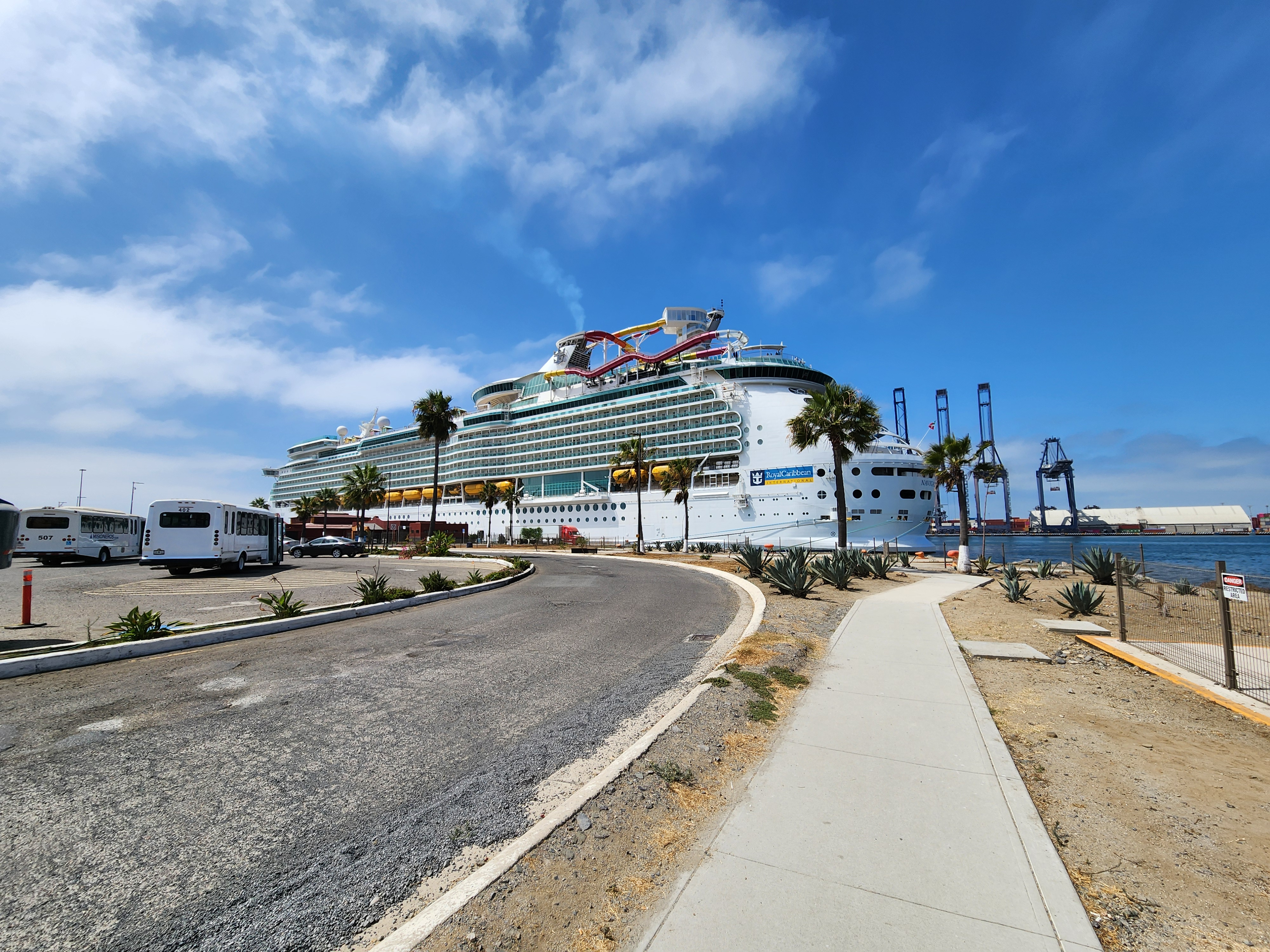
- Navigator of the Seas docked at Ensenada, Baja California, Mexico on 8 August 2024

History
- Name: Navigator of the Seas
- Owner: Royal Caribbean Ships LLC.
- Operator: Royal Caribbean International
- Port of registry: 2002–2026: Nassau, Bahamas; 2026–present: Limassol, Cyprus
- Route: Mexican Riviera
- Ordered: 24 May 2000
- Builder: Kværner Masa-Yards Turku New Shipyard, Finland
- Yard number: 1347
- Laid down: 27 September 2000
- Launched: 25 January 2002
- Sponsored by: Steffi Graf
- Christened: 6 December 2002
- Completed: 18 November 2002
- Maiden voyage: 14 December 2002
- In service: 2002–present
- Identification: Call sign: C6FU4; IMO number: 9227508; MMSI number: 311478000
- Status: In Active Service

General characteristics
- Class & type: Voyager-class cruise ship
- Tonnage: 139,999 GT
- Length: 311 m (1,020 ft 4 in)
- Beam: 38.6 m (126 ft 8 in) - Waterline
- Height: 63 m (206 ft 8 in)
- Draft: 9.124 m (29 ft 11.2 in)
- Depth: 21.3 m (69 ft 11 in)
- Decks: 15
- Capacity: 3,386 passengers (double-occupancy); 4,000 passengers (maximum)
- Crew: 1,200

Navigator of the Seas is a cruise ship operated by Royal Caribbean International. She is a second generation Voyager-class cruise ship.

== Construction and description ==
Constructed at Kværner Masa-Yards Turku New Shipyard, Finland, the ship originally measured 138,279 gross tonnage (GT) and carried 3,807 passengers plus additional crew. A refurbishment in 2014 added 81 additional staterooms, increasing the ship's tonnage to 139,570 GT. The ship's dimensions are 1,020 feet (310 m) in length with a breadth of 157.5 feet (48.0 m).

Navigator of the Seas underwent a US$115 million refit in January 2019, increasing passenger capacity to 4,000 and size to 139,999 GT.

== Service history ==
The ship was christened in a ceremony by its godmother, German former tennis player Steffi Graf.

As of November 2014 Navigator of the Seas was sailing Caribbean itineraries year-round out of Galveston, Texas. Navigator of the Seas was sailing Mediterranean cruises based out of Civitavecchia, Italy until November 2012. In November 2012, she began to depart from New Orleans, Louisiana where she sailed Western Caribbean cruises until early April 2013. She returned to Civitavecchia for mid 2013 before moving to Galveston to undertake Mexico cruises.

In January 2014, Navigator of the Seas was modified while dry docked, this included increasing the number of cabins by removing some of the public facilities and adding a Wave Loch FlowRider surfing simulator, an outdoor movie screen and two new lounges.

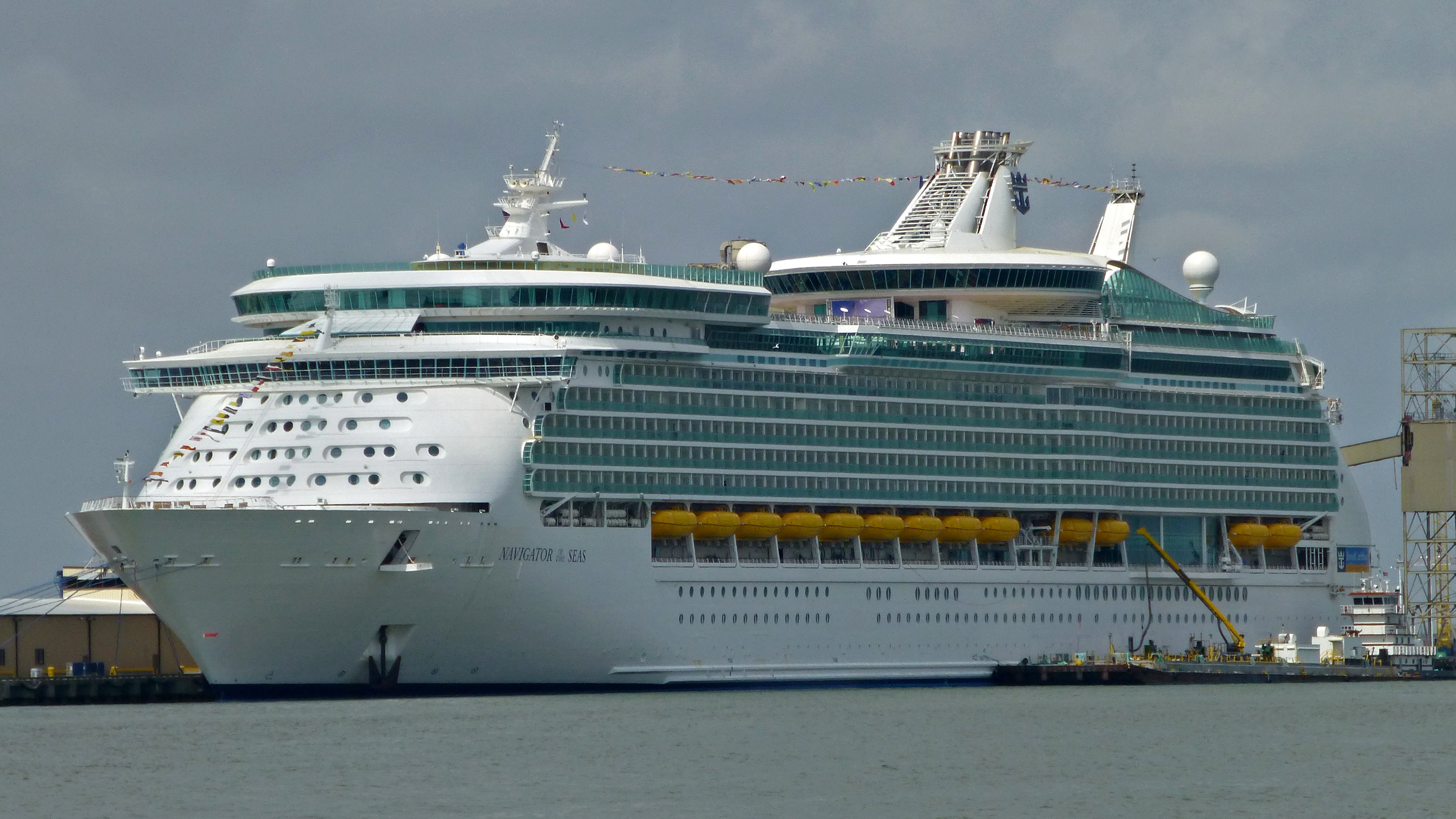
Navigator of the Seas docked at Galveston Texas on 25 May 2014

In November 2015, after two seasons sailing from Galveston, Navigator of the Seas began sailing winter itineraries out of Port Everglades in Fort Lauderdale, Florida, where she sailed Eastern and Western Caribbean itineraries, and summer itineraries out of Southampton, England, where she sails to the Mediterranean and Northern Europe. From November 2016, Navigator of the Seas transitioned to sailing her winter itineraries out of Port of Miami in Miami, Florida. On 28 October 2018, Navigator of the Seas began taking on water after a stabilizer failed, creating a hole in the ship's hull.

Navigator of the Seas returned to service on 19 November 2021 and is home ported at Los Angeles. She rotates between seven-day Mexican Riviera cruises and 3–4-night Ensenada, Mexico cruises.

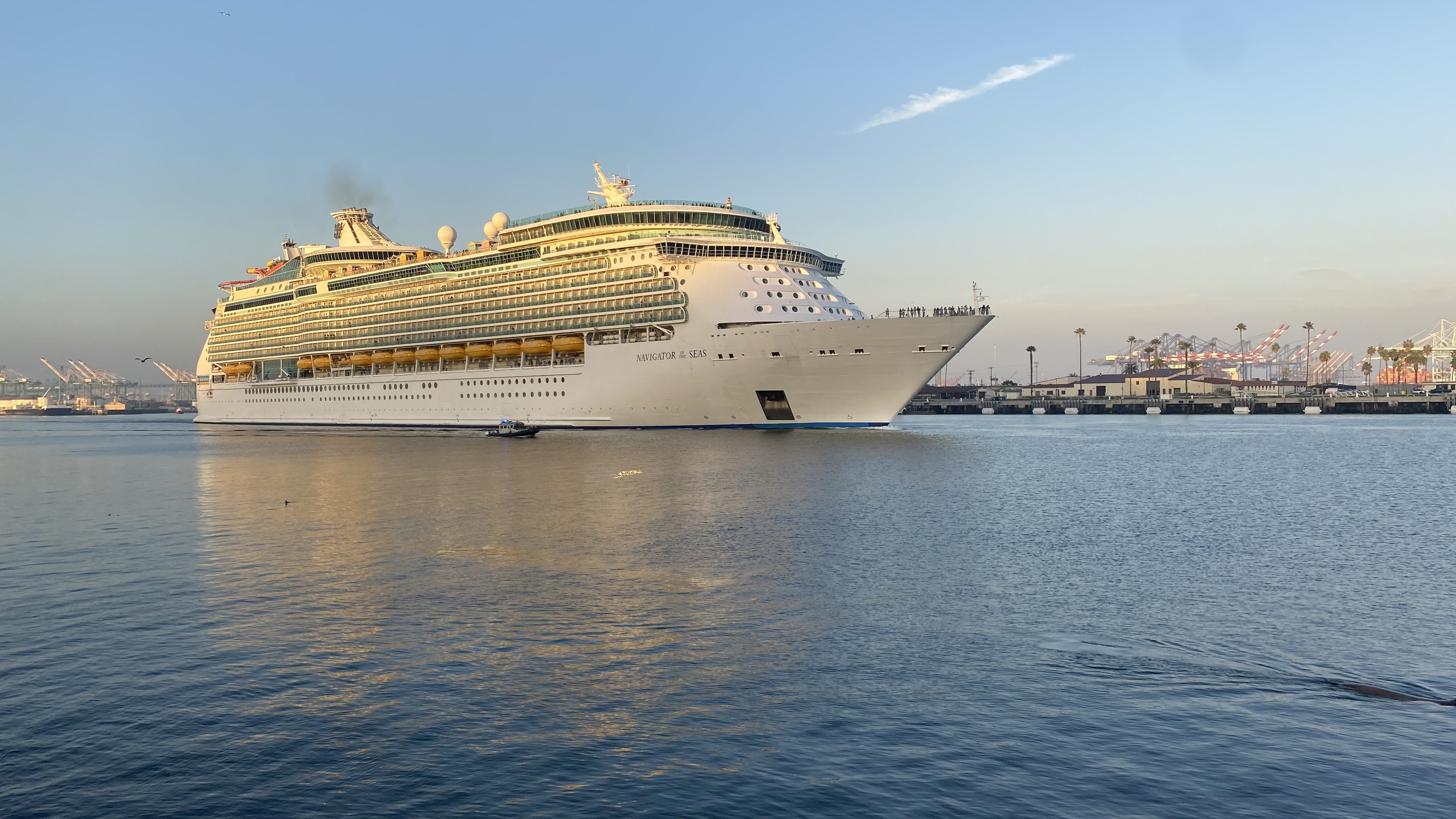
Navigator of the Seas departing San Pedro (Los Angeles County), California on 19 December 2025
