= Mariner of the Seas =

Royal Caribbean cruise ship

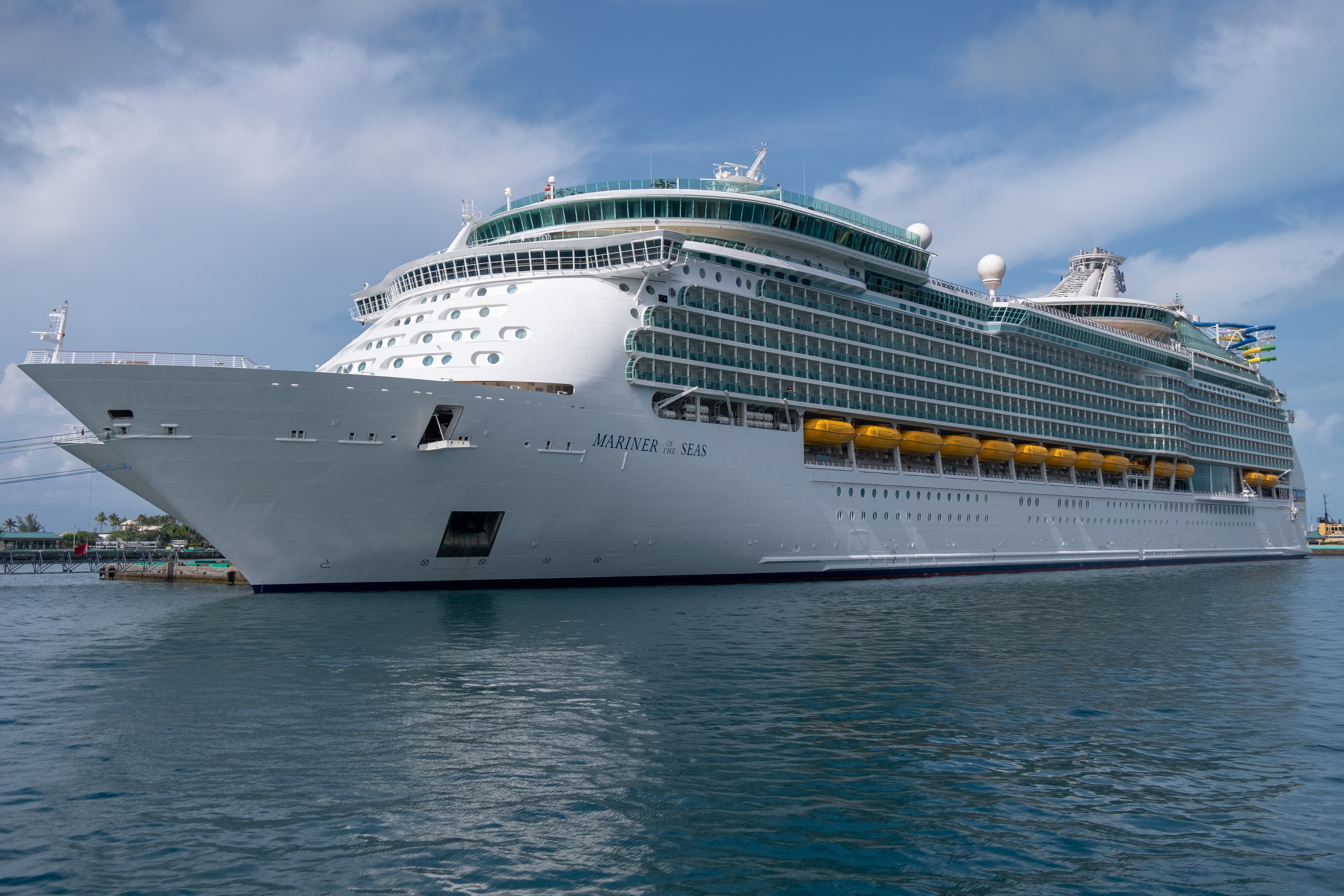
- Mariner of the Seas in June 2018

History

Bahamas
- Name: Mariner of the Seas
- Owner: Royal Caribbean Ships LLC
- Operator: Royal Caribbean International
- Port of registry: Nassau, Bahamas
- Builder: Kværner Masa-Yards Turku New Shipyard, Finland
- Cost: US$650 million
- Yard number: 1348
- Laid down: 3 April 2002
- Launched: 28 February 2003
- Christened: 14 November 2003
- Completed: 31 October 2003
- Maiden voyage: 16 November 2003
- In service: 16 November 2003
- Identification: Call sign: C6FV9; DNV ID: 22760; IMO number: 9227510; MMSI number: 311493000
- Status: In service

General characteristics
- Class & type: Voyager-class cruise ship
- Tonnage: 139,863 GT
- Length: 311.12 m (1,020 ft 9 in)
- Beam: 38.6 m (126 ft 8 in) - Waterline; 48.0 m (157.5 ft) - Max
- Height: 63 m (206 ft 8 in)
- Draft: 8.6 m (28 ft 3 in)
- Installed power: 6 × Wärtsilä 12V46 (6 × 12,600 kW)
- Propulsion: Diesel-electric; Two ABB Azipods and one Fixipod; Four bow thrusters
- Speed: 22 knots (41 km/h; 25 mph) (service); 24 knots (44 km/h; 28 mph) (maximum)
- Capacity: 3,114 passengers
- Crew: 1,185

Mariner of the Seas is one of five Voyager-class cruise ships of Royal Caribbean International and can accommodate 4,252 passengers.

Mariner of the Seas is a second generation Voyager-class vessel.

The ship's godmother is American paralympic athlete Jean Driscoll.

== Description ==
The ship has a diesel-electric powertrain using three Azipod azimuth thrusters. Each propeller is driven by a double wound 3-phase synchronous motor of 14,000 kW (19,000 hp) with four-bladed fixed-pitch bronze propellers. She has a maximum speed of 24 knots (44 km/h; 28 mph).

Mariner of the Seas has 1,674 passenger cabins.

== Service history ==
In early 2018, after a month long refit costing US$120 million which included adding additional cabins, the ship's gross tonnage was increased to 139,863 from 138,279.

In 2018, Mariner of the Seas operated cruises from Port Canaveral, Florida to the Bahamas visiting Nassau and Coco Cay. To facilitate re-positioning to Miami, Florida the ship performed three cruises. Firstly from Singapore to Dubai, then Dubai to Barcelona via the Suez Canal and the final leg sailed from Barcelona to Miami.

=== COVID-19 pandemic ===
During the coronavirus pandemic, the Miami Herald reported that, after cruises were cancelled worldwide and they had disembarked all passengers, Royal Caribbean Cruises had refused the CDC rules to repatriate many of their crew members due to the associated costs, with many crew members turning to desperate measures, such as hunger strikes, as a result. On 10 May 2020, a male Chinese crew member of Mariner of the Seas was found dead aboard the ship. (Note: Schiffe und Kreuzfahrten reported that Cruise Law News had stated that the crew member was found dead in his cabin, although the article Cruise Law News published appeared to not include this detail.)

=== Passenger rescue ===
In June 2023, a 42-year old passenger fell from the 10th deck of the ship while moving out of port in the Dominican Republic. Crew members were able to rescue the passenger from the water with minor injuries.
