= Adventure of the Seas =

Voyager-class cruise ship

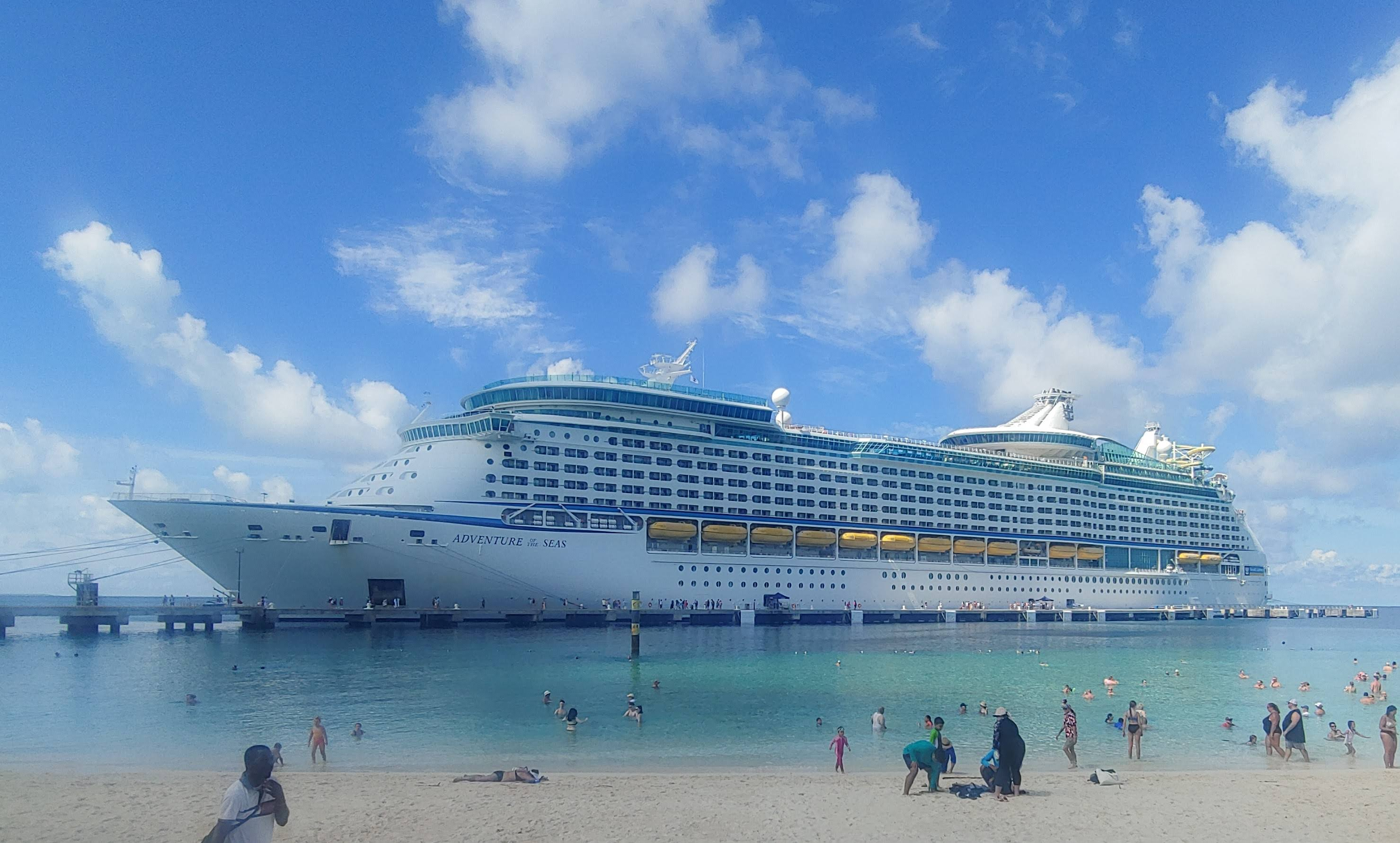
- Adventure of the Seas at Grand Turk on 24 September 2024

History

Bahamas
- Name: Adventure of the Seas
- Owner: Adventure of the Seas Inc.
- Operator: Royal Caribbean International
- Port of registry: Nassau, (The Bahamas)
- Route: Caribbean, Bahamas, Bermuda, Canada
- Ordered: 24 April 1997
- Builder: Kværner Masa-Yards Turku New Shipyard, Finland
- Cost: $500 million
- Yard number: 1346
- Laid down: 17 June 1998
- Launched: 5 January 2001
- Christened: 10 November 2001
- Completed: 26 October 2001
- Maiden voyage: 18 November 2001
- In service: 2001–present
- Identification: IMO number: 9167227; Call Sign C6SA3; MMSI number: 311263000; DNV ID: 38353
- Status: In service

General characteristics
- Class & type: Voyager-class cruise ship
- Tonnage: 138,193 GT; 108,644 NT; 11,033 DWT
- Length: 311.1 m (1,020 ft 8 in)
- Beam: 38.6 m (126 ft 8 in) (waterline); 49.1 m (161 ft 1 in) (extreme)
- Height: 63 m (206 ft 8 in)
- Draft: 9.1 m (29 ft 10 in)
- Depth: 11.7 m (38 ft 5 in)
- Decks: 14 passenger decks
- Installed power: 6 × Wärtsilä 12V46 (6 × 12,423 kW, 16,660 hp)
- Propulsion: Diesel-electric; Three ABB Azipods; 4 bow thrusters
- Speed: 22.5 knots (41.7 km/h; 25.9 mph)
- Capacity: 3,807 passengers (max)
- Crew: 1,185

Adventure of the Seas is a Voyager-class cruise ship operated by Royal Caribbean International. The vessel was launched and entered service in 2001. Registered in the Bahamas, Adventure of the Seas has cruised from ports in the United States and Europe to sites in the Caribbean Sea, Baltic Sea, Mediterranean Sea, Canada and Europe. The ship has a 138,193 gross tonnage (GT) and is 311.1 meters (1,020 ft 8 in) long with capacity for 3,807 guests.

== Design and description ==
Adventure of the Seas is the third of five Voyager-class cruise ships measured at 138,193 gross tonnage (GT), 108,644 net tonnage (NT) and 11,033 tons deadweight (DWT). The vessel is 311.1 meters (1,020 ft 8 in) long with a beam of 38.6 m (126 ft 8 in) at the waterline and 49.1 m (161 ft 1 in) at the extreme. The vessel has a draft of 9.1 m (29 ft 10 in) and a depth of 11.7 m (38 ft 5 in). (Note: Smith gives the draft of the vessel as 8.78 m (28 ft 10 in).) The vessel is powered by a diesel-electric system composed of six 12,423-kilowatt (16,660 hp) Wärtsilä 12V46 engines for a total of 74,538 kW (99,957 hp) driving three 3 MW (4,000 hp) ABB Azipods and four bow thrusters. This gives the cruise ship a maximum speed of 22.5 knots (41.7 km/h; 25.9 mph).

The ship has 15 decks of which 14 are passenger decks with capacity for a maximum of 3,807 guests. The Voyager-class ships have a four-deck-high horizontal promenade, called the Royal Promenade. The length of the promenade is roughly 120 metres (393 ft 8 in), and situated at each end is an 11-deck high atrium, called the Centrum. The passengers are spread out over 1,557 staterooms of which 765 are balcony, 174 are along the outside with 618 along the inside. 565 come with a 3/4th berth and 26 are accessible for persons with disabilities. 138 are located along the promenade. Adventure of the Seas comes equipped with an outdoor movie screen, an Aqua Park, cyclone and typhoon water slides, as well as a FlowRider. The ship has a crew of 1,185.

== Construction and career ==
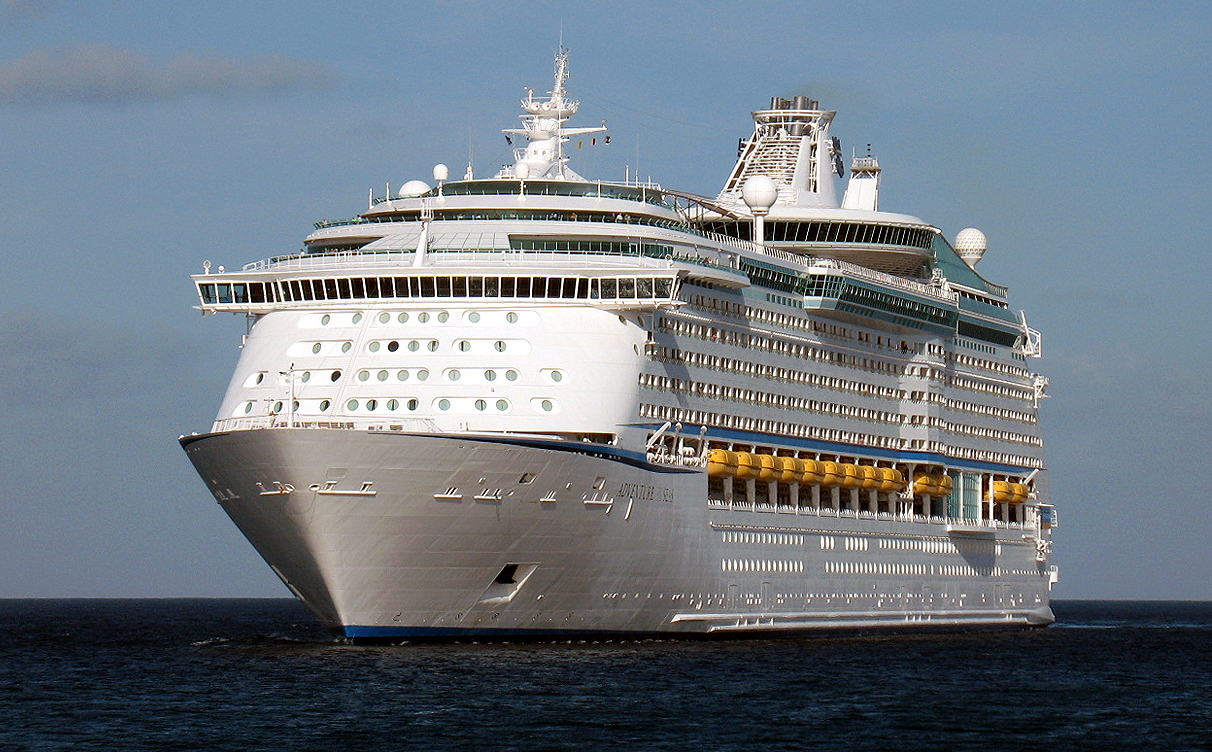
Adventure of the Seas approaching Barbados on 13 May 2008

The vessel was ordered on 24 April 1997 for $500 million and constructed at Kværner Masa-Yards Turku New Shipyard in Finland. The ship's keel was laid down on 17 June 1998. Named Adventure of the Seas, the cruise ship was launched on 5 January 2001 and completed on 26 October 2001. The ship's godparents are Tara Stackpole and Kevin Hannafin of the New York Fire Department along with Margaret McDonnell and Richard Lucas of the New York Police Department. (Note: Smith has the ship sponsor at the christening as Rudy Giuliani.) The vessel is operated by Royal Caribbean International (RCI) and is registered at Nassau, Bahamas. Adventure of the Seas departed on its maiden voyage on 18 November 2001.

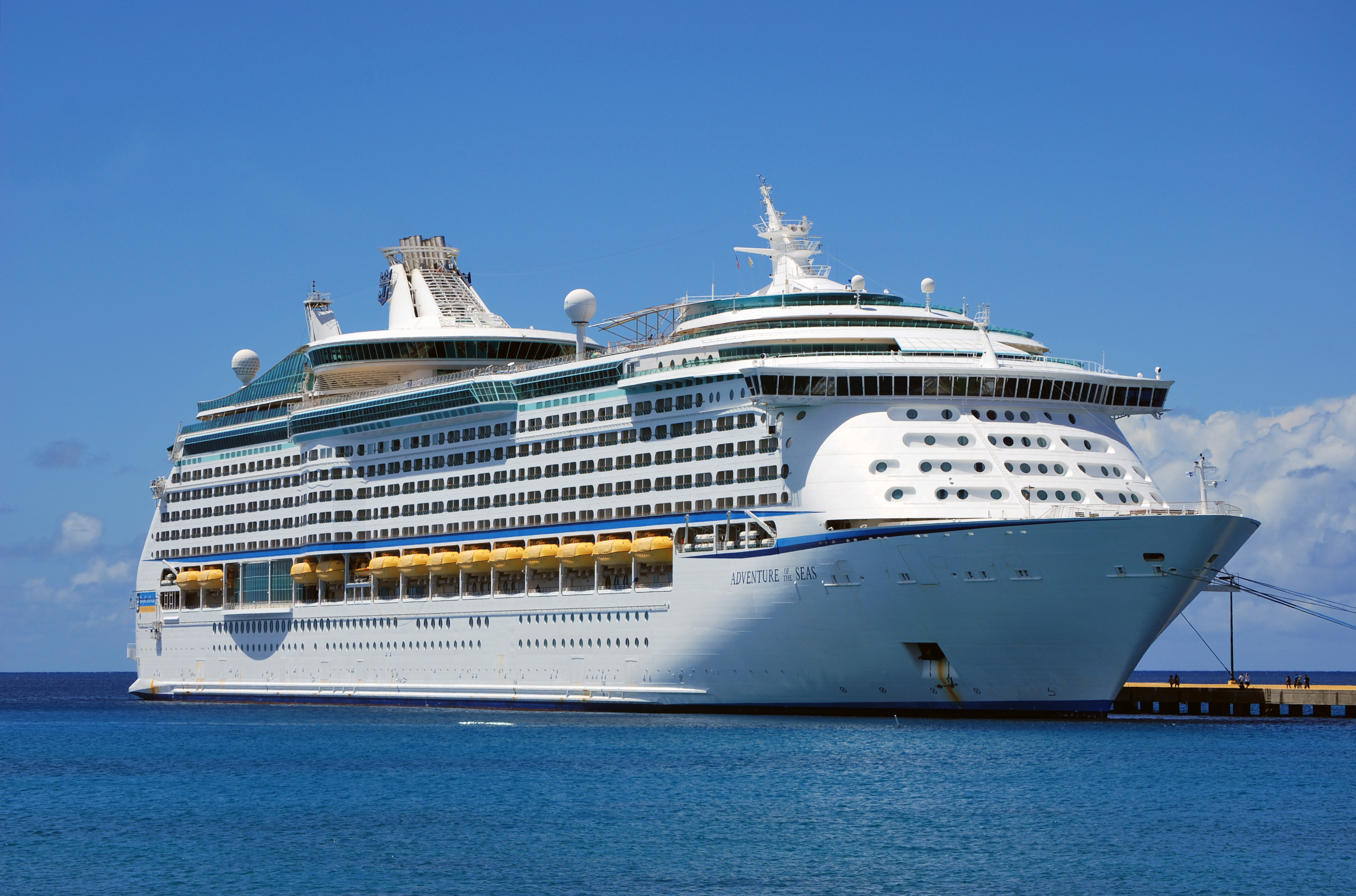
Adventure of the Seas docked at Saint Croix on 12 March 2012

Adventure of the Seas has cruised from United States ports to the Caribbean, Bahamas and Canada and from European ports to Baltic, Mediterranean, and Northern European destinations. In 2016, the cruise ship underwent a $61 million refurbishment, among the changes included adding additional staterooms. Adventure of the Seas was the fifth ship of the RCI fleet to undergo the refit.

=== COVID-19 pandemic ===
During the coronavirus pandemic, on 22 May 2020, Loop Jamaica reported that five crew members of Adventure of the Seas recently repatriated to Jamaica had tested positive for the virus. The ship had docked at Falmouth, Jamaica, on 19 May with 1,044 Jamaican workers aboard. All Jamaican workers were to be repatriated and tested for the virus. Those not of Jamaican nationality, stated to be over 300 people, were not allowed to disembark. By 24 May, nine crew members in total had tested positive; by 26 May 19 in total had tested positive, and 624 negative. The ship remained in the St. Maarten area during the pandemic.

On 19 March 2021, it was announced that Royal Caribbean would resume cruise services in the Caribbean, with Adventure of the Seas operating from Nassau, beginning in June 2021. Despite the ongoing pandemic, guests would be allowed to board the ship after having shown proof of vaccination and the entire crew would be vaccinated. In November 2022, Royal Caribbean updated its policy and stated that "Pre-cruise testing is no longer required to sail, with a few exceptions. At this time, only the following sailings have pre-cruise testing requirements: For Cruises from the U.S. and Caribbean with stops in Colombia, Haiti, or Honduras From Transatlantic Cruises For Cruises from Australia."

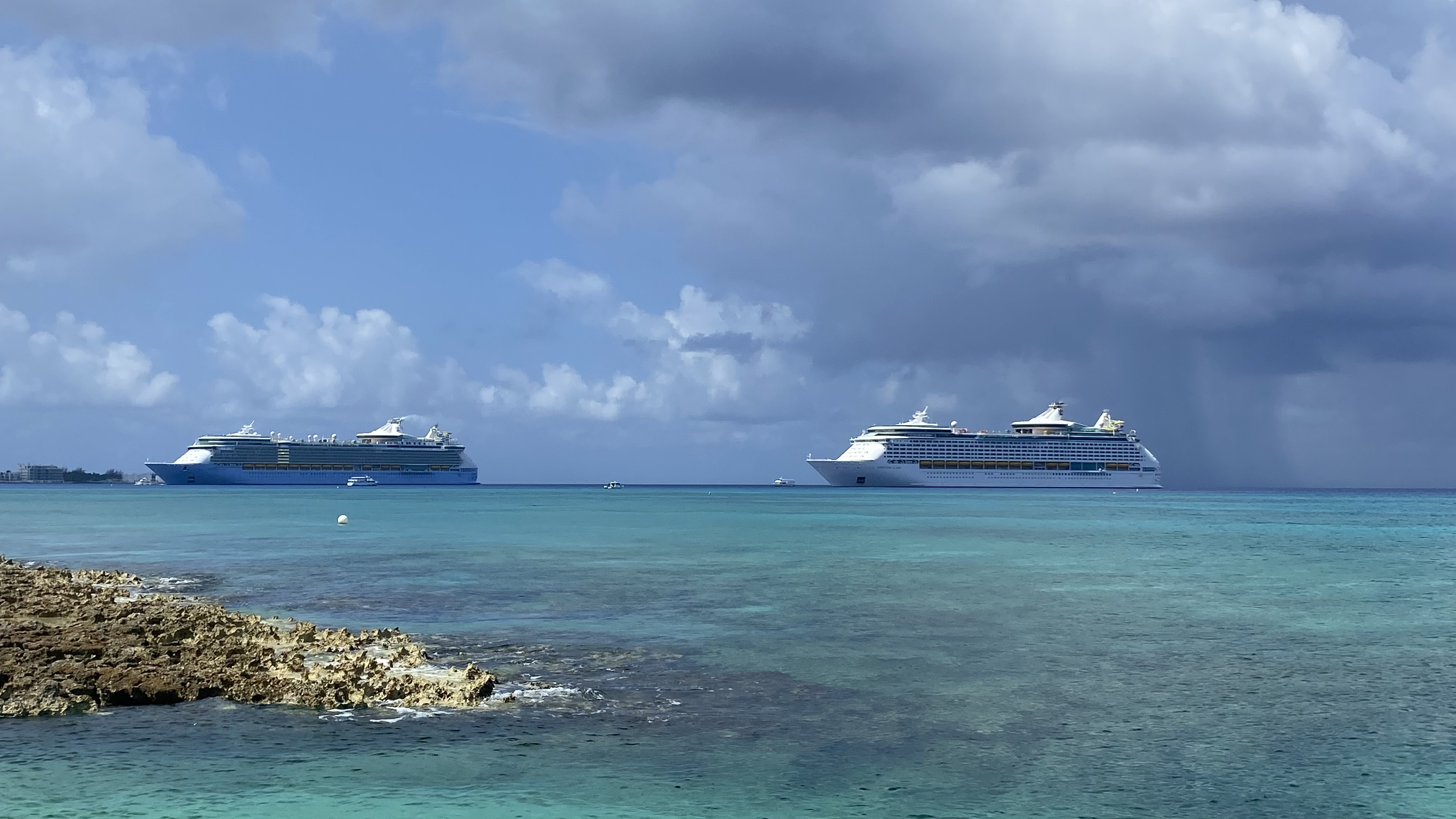
Adventure of the Seas with Freedom of the Seas at Grand Cayman on 28 April 2025
