= Perno shipyard =

Shipyard in Turku, Finland

Coordinates: 60.454407°N 22.126118°E

Aerial views of Perno shipyard, Turku, Finland with Icon of the Seas and Carnival Celebration cruise ships under construction.

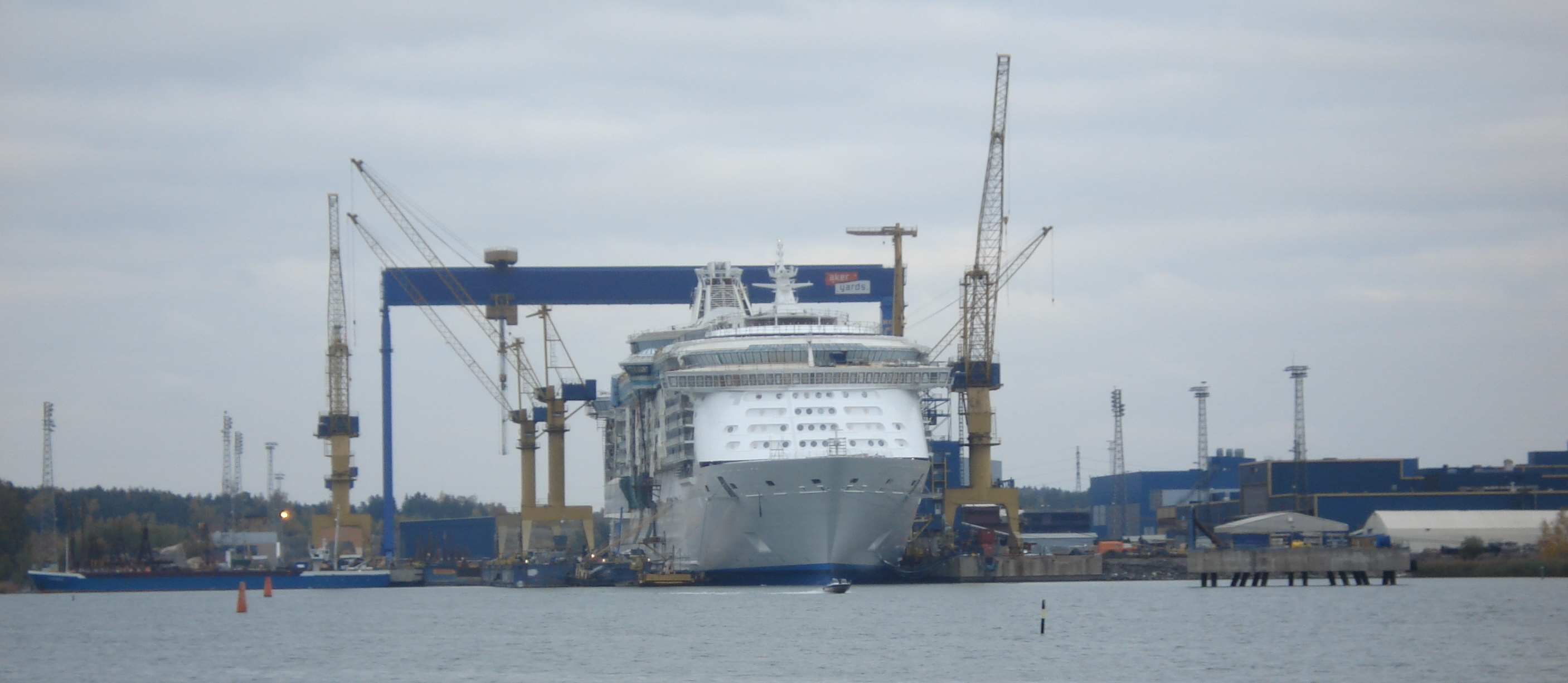
Independence of the Seas under construction at Perno shipyard in 2007

Perno shipyard is a shipyard in Turku, southwest Finland, that specialises in building cruise ships, passenger ferries, special vessels and offshore projects. The yard area is 144 hectares (360 acres) and is operated by Meyer Turku Oy with a dry dock 365 metres (1,198 ft) long, 80 metres (260 ft) wide and 10 metres (33 ft) deep. It has one of the largest bridge crane in the Nordic region with a capacity of 1,200 tonnes and a smaller crane with a capacity of 600 tonnes.

== History ==
=== Construction ===
Wärtsilä's shipbuilding grew heavily in the 1960s and over time the old yard area on both banks of the Aura river that runs through Turku became too small. When Tankmar Horn was appointed general manager of Wärtsilä in 1971, the idea of a modern "ship factory" started to evolve, inspired by the Swedish Götaverken Arendal yard.

The area selected for the new yard was in Perno, then part of Raisio, some 10 km (6.2 mi) from the centre of Turku. The area was joined to Turku, and on 8 April 1974 the city council approved a plan to sell 144 hectares (360 acres) of land and 34 hectares (84 acres) of water area to Wärtsilä for a new shipyard. The work was launched in a ceremony held on 16 May 1974, when president Urho Kekkonen detonated the first explosive charge of the site work. The number of construction workers rose to over 1,000 people.

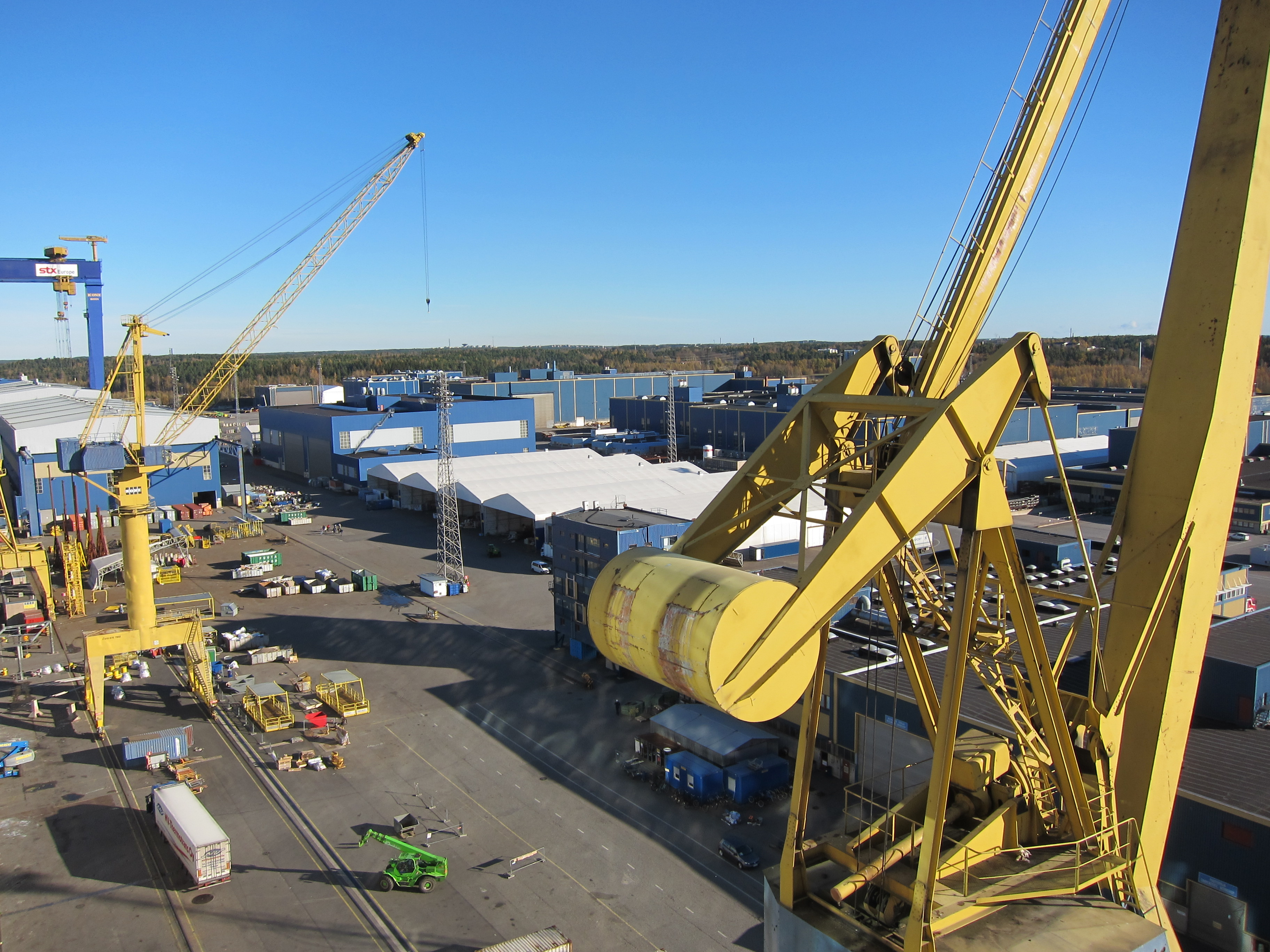
Shipyard cranes and buildings in 2010.

The first part of construction was the dry dock, which was then specified to a length of 250 metres (820 ft) and width of 80 metres (260 ft), and measured for two 100,000 dry weight vessels, a bridge crane of 600-tonne capacity, 70-metre (230 ft) operative height and 150-metre (490 ft) track, two 50-tonne level luffing cranes, a warm hall of 42,000 m^{2} (450,000 sq ft) for steelworks, paint shop, service building and an office building with dressing rooms. At this stage the headcount was 1,200; the workers were from the old yard, where the capacity was reduced respectively. Designing, administration, special ship building up to 40,000 tonnes, diesel engine production and ship repairs were decided to be kept at the old yard for then.

The schedule was tight – the first keel laying was to be in 1976 and the ship was supposed to be handed over in 1977. The record-long order book of Wärtsilä gave an additional challenge to the project. Operations in the steel sheet shop were started at the end of 1975. Despite the tough endeavour, the first ship of Wärtsilä Perno Shipyard, Gas Rising Sun (NB 1229) was handed over no earlier than 1978. The yard was fully operational in 1979, but until 1982 the vessels were tugged to the old yard for outfitting.

While moving the production to the new yard, shipbuilding methods were developed. Hulls were now constructed from large modules and an increasing proportion of welding and sheet metal work was performed indoors. Wärtsilä started a new computing centre in Perno in 1978. Ten years later the yard began the world's first computer-aided line production of modules with a system developed jointly with the Norwegian company Total Transportation Systems. A CAD/CAM system was introduced in 1984. Production rationalisation affected on outfitting work in particular, which was increasingly outsourced.

=== Shipbuilding crisis ===
At the end of the 1970s Wärtsilä produced mainly gas tankers, passenger ships and cargo ships. In the early 1980s Soviet exports, which had been low in the previous years, rose again until the mid-1980s – they postponed the impact of the European shipbuilding crisis, which was caused by the price dumping of Asian shipbuilders.

=== Wärtsilä Marine and bankruptcy ===
Wärtsilä and Valmet put together their shipbuilding businesses, creating Wärtsilä Marine at the beginning of 1987. At that time Perno yard had only one non-started project on its order book, cruise ship NB 1294 to be delivered in 1988. The number of personnel was reduced heavily. The yard got more work already in January from nine projects originally addressed to Valmet yard, which was to be closed down. The order book grew in 1987 by four passenger ships and two more orders followed in 1988.

The sudden growth in their order book, together with errors in price calculations and other reasons, led to the bankruptcy of Wärtsilä Marine on 23 October 1989. At the time there were seven ships on the order book of which two were at quay for outfitting, one was under construction in the dry dock, two were partly started and two ships were at designing phase. The cruiseferry Cinderella was nearly ready and handed over just six days after the bankruptcy, when the shipowner SF-Line made the last payment.

=== New start ===
On 7 November 1989, just two weeks after the bankruptcy, a new company was started by Helsinki yard manager Martin Saarikangas. The company name was Masa-Yards Oy and the owners were state of Finland, Suomen Yhdyspankki and shipowners of which ships laid unfinished at the Perno and Helsinki yards. The first task of the new company was finishing the ordered craft. On 19 January 1990 Effoa's Silja Serenade was launched; it was the largest cruiseferry built in Finland at the time. Kalypso, launched in the previous summer, was handed over the same spring. Silja Serenade was handed over in November in the same day when its sister ship Silja Symphony was launched; Symphony was handed over in spring 1991. The remaining two cruise ships ordered by CCL were eventually built at Helsinki shipyard.

=== Kværner Masa-Yards ===
Both the founding shipowners and the state wanted to sell their shares of Masa-Yards as soon as the operations were restarted. In 1991 the major owner became Norwegian Kværner and the company was renamed Kværner Masa-Yards.

Soon after the situation was stabilised, the Perno yard started to gain more orders. The most significant were a cruise ship ordered by the Japanese Yusen Kaisha and four LNG carriers ordered from United Arab Emirates. In the late 1990s the yard started building Voyager-class cruise ships for Royal Caribbean International; the 1999 commissioned Voyager of the Seas was first followed by two additional orders for sister ships Explorer of the Seas and Adventure of the Seas. Later the shipowner placed orders for two more upgraded ships, Navigator of the Seas and Mariner of the Seas, which entered in service in 2002 and 2003.

=== Aker Yards and STX Finland ===
Another Norwegian company, Aker, took over Kværner in 2001. In 2004 it was announced that the Perno and Helsinki yards operated by Kværner Masa-Yards, and Rauma shipyard, already owned by Aker before, were merged into one organisation. From beginning of 2005 the three yards operated under name Aker Finnyards. The company name was changed Aker Yards on 7 June 2006. The Korean shipbuilding company STX became a major owner in Aker in 2008. The name Aker Yards was replaced by STX Europe on 3 November 2008.

=== Meyer Turku ===
The Perno yard was bought from STX by Meyer Werft and the state of Finland in August 2014, and it has been operated by Meyer Turku after that. In April 2015 Meyer Werft bought the 30% formerly owned by the state of Finland and is now the sole proprietor. Under Meyer ownership the shipyard has been successful; the order book in spring of 2019 was filled to 2024 (seven ships).

== Sources ==
- von Knorring, Nils (1995). Aurajoen veistämöt ja telakat [Boat- and Shipyards along River Aura] (in Finnish). Espoo, Finland: Schildts Förlags Ab. ISBN 951-50-0735-6.
- Grönros, Jarmo; Kujanen, Hannu; Priamursky, G.; Rinta-Tassi, Osmo; Saarinen, Jarmo; Teräs, Kari; Trofimov, S. (1996). Aurajoen rautakourat — Järnnävarna vid Aura Å (in Finnish and Swedish). Turku, Finland: Turun maakuntamuseo — Åbo landskapsmuseum. ISBN 951-595-020-1.
