= Mario Salcedo =

American businessman and cruise passenger

Mario Salcedo (born 1949 or 1950), nicknamed Super Mario, is an American businessman and a long-term passenger on cruise ships. He has continuously lived on Royal Caribbean International cruise ships since 2000, aside from about 15 days on land a year and a 15-month gap during the COVID-19 pandemic in 2020 and 2021.

Born in Cuba, Salcedo immigrated with his parents to the Miami metropolitan area when he was seven years old and later became a naturalized American citizen. He received economics and finance undergraduate and graduate degrees, after which he worked in Miami at a multinational corporation where he rose to the level of international finance director. The role required a large amount of traveling in Latin America. After 21 years of work, he resigned from the company in 1996 at the age of 47, and embarked on more than 100 cruises on different cruise lines between 1997 and 2000. He eventually settled with Royal Caribbean after experiencing Voyager of the Seas, the largest cruise ship at the time, in January 2000.

Working from the cruise ship, Salcedo manages an online investment management business for 10 high-net-worth individuals. By 2016, Salcedo had been on more than 1,000 cruises, 850 of which were with Royal Caribbean, and had spent more than 6,000 nights on board Royal Caribbean ships. The documentarian Lance Oppenheim profiled Salcedo in the documentary short The Happiest Guy in the World in 2018.

== Early life and early career ==
Mario Salcedo was born in 1949 or 1950 in Cuba. After his parents felt they could not stay in the country, he immigrated with them to Florida when he was seven years old. At the beginning of the 1960s, his family moved to the Miami metropolitan area, and became naturalized American citizens. Salcedo received economics and finance undergraduate and graduate degrees. While working in Miami at a multinational corporation, he served as an international finance director. For his job, he traveled across Latin America; in total, he lived in hotel rooms for longer than he lived in his Miami home. Estimating that he spent 90% of his time traveling, Salcedo accrued three million miles for airlines' frequent-flyer programs. With the dual objectives of global trekking and founding a small business, he resigned from his director job in 1996 when he was 47, having developed occupational burnout.

== Living on cruise ships ==
Dismayed with air travel, Salcedo decided in 1997 to go on a cruise after noticing cruise ships at the Miami port. He subsequently scheduled six consecutive cruises. Between 1997 and 2000, he embarked on over 100 back-to-back cruises on nearly all the main cruise lines. In January 2000, Salcedo went on Royal Caribbean's Voyager of the Seas, which then had been the biggest cruise ship. He marveled at how the ship was "so revolutionary—the first ice skating rink, the first rock climbing wall, so many elements that took cruising to another dimension". After experiencing Voyager of the Seas, Salcedo has only travelled on Royal Caribbean ships since 2000. In the 2000s, Charles Teige, captain of Liberty of the Seas, gave him the nickname "Super Mario". The name has persisted even on other ships Salcedo boards.

By 2016, Salcedo had been on about 1,000 cruises, of which roughly 850 had been on Royal Caribbean, and he had visited 25 of the line's cruise ships. By that year, after around two decades of cruising, he had spent over 6,000 nights on board Royal Caribbean ships, which cost him about US$1.4 million. Cruising costs him between $60,000 and $70,000 every year. He routinely stays on a ship for six months before moving to another ship to spend six months. To finance flights to cruise ports, he uses miles he accrues from funding the cruises with credit cards. To minimize costs, Salcedo consistently stays in inside rooms. To increase the chances of his remaining in the same room, Salcedo reserves cruises two years ahead of time. Joyce Wood, associated with Cincinnati company Cruise 800, became his travel agent around 2004. After he sends the reservations to Wood, she monitors the bookings' costs and secures cheaper tickets whenever the price goes down. In return, she receives the commissions from the bookings.

Salcedo's extensive cruising on Royal Caribbean landed him in the line's highest loyalty tier, which gave him free Internet access. He uses the Internet to work as an investment manager. Salcedo started his venture through his contacts and by 2016 was managing the investment portfolios of 10 high-net-worth individuals. On the wall near where he works is a plaque that bears the words "Super Mario's Office". He maintains his business from a pool deckchair that gives him an ocean view. After finishing his work for the day, he socializes with friends on the ship, swims in the pool, or watches football and basketball games on the television. When visiting the Western Caribbean zone, Salcedo goes scuba diving. At Christmas in 2012, he played Santa Claus for the children on the ship and gave them presents.

Salcedo's exploits were documented by Lance Oppenheim in The Happiest Guy in the World, a 10-minute New York Times Op-Doc that debuted on April 19, 2018, at the Tribeca Festival. Aeon praised the documentary short for its "clever cinematography and editing" and found it "subtly probes deeper questions of freedom, capitalism and meaning-making". In the documentary short, Salcedo bemoaned not being able to receive Fox News on his room's television.

With occasional breaks, Salcedo has been living on cruise ships continuously for over 20 years with only a 15-month gap caused by the COVID-19 pandemic. In March 2020, at the beginning of the pandemic, he stopped living on cruise ships and moved to Palm Beach, Aruba, and when the cruise restart happened, Salcedo resumed going on cruises in July 2021 on the MS Freedom of the Seas.

== Personal life ==
Salcedo has never been married, and he has no children. He is not on social media. He owns a two-bedroom condominium in Miami, and uses one of the rooms to display his cruise mementos. In between cruises, Salcedo spends several hours a week at the condo to keep an eye on it. Spending roughly 15 days a year on land, Salcedo uses the time to visit doctors, the bank, or travel to his next cruise port via airplane. After an interview request, Royal Caribbean told CNN in 2022 that Salcedo had stopped speaking with the media.
