= Wave Loch =

Wave pool attraction manufacturer

Wave Loch LLC.

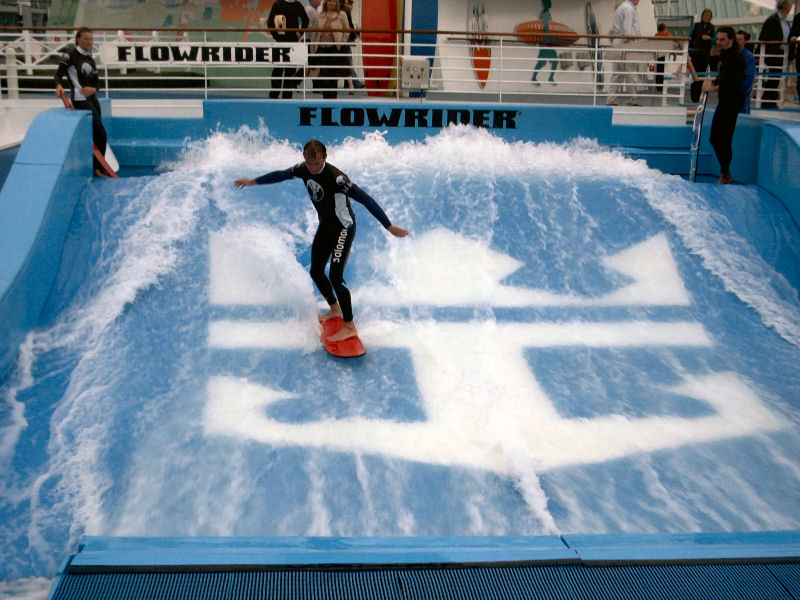
- Industry: Water attraction manufacturer
- Founded: 1991
- Founder: Tom Lochtefeld
- Headquarters: 9747 Olson Drive, San Diego, California, 92121, United States
- Products: SurfPool, FlowBarrel, FlowTour, Wave House
- Website: Official Website

Wave Loch Inc. is a surf ride manufacturing company responsible for such water rides as the FlowBarrel, Flying Reef, SurfPool, Wave House franchises, and, formerly, FlowRider. These water attractions grew to mainstream popularity thanks to their use in many popular water parks and cruise ships.

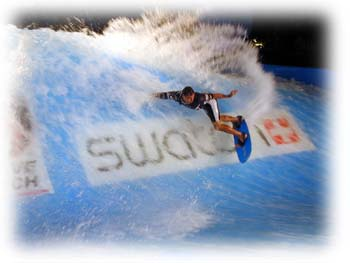
Kelly Slater carving the mobile FlowBarrel during the Swatch Wave Tour, 1999.

== History ==
During the 1980s, Tom Lochtefeld was a partner in the development of Raging Waters water parks in the United States. He created a water park attraction to simulate the riding of waves in the ocean. In 1988, a patent was taken out for "a wave-forming generator for generating inclined surfaces on a contained body of water". This was the concept of a sheet wave, the basis of most of Wave Loch's rides. Lochtefeld worked with Charles Sauerbier, Carl Ekstrom and others to model the wave using wave tanks at the Scripps Institution of Oceanography in La Jolla.

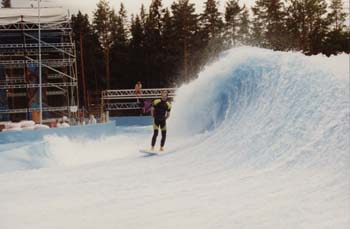
Tom Lochtefeld test flowing the first FlowBarrel at Bø Sommarland, Norway.

The first WaveLoch FlowRider opened at the Schlitterbahn in Texas in 1991. This was followed by the first FlowBarrel at the Summerland Resort in Norway two years later.

In 1999, Wave Loch built a portable FlowBarrel, which was shipped around the world to support the SWATCH and Siemens Wave Tours. This portable FlowBarrel visited Florence, Munich, Australia and other places. Wave House South Africa opened in 2001 with a double FlowBarrel called the D Rex, and two FlowRider Singles at the center of an entertainment, retail and food and beverage complex.

In 2005, Wave House San Diego opened at the northwest corner of the Belmont Park amusement area in San Diego, where the company headquarters was located for ten years. By 2009, Wave Loch had sold more than 175 FlowRider sheet waves to locations around the world. In 2014, there were Wave Houses located in Durban, San Diego, Santiago, Chile, Sentosa, Singapore, and Mallorca. Additional locations are planned for Miami, Orange County, and three in China.

In 2014, Wave Loch sold the FlowRider IP and technology to WhiteWater West, although it retained the Flow Barrel and Wave House brands. As of 2018, there are over 230 FlowRiders installed around the world.

That same year, after ten years of R&D, Wave Loch introduced its Surf Pool line of compressed-air-powered wave pools. With its goal of making surfing an Olympic sport, Wave Loch’s Surf Pool generates 2-metre-high (6.6 ft) waves every ten seconds in a 5,000 m^{2} (1.2 acres) footprint.

By 2020, Wave Loch’s SurfLoch technology was reported to have 10 projects underway, including locations in Australia, Spain, Germany, and five in the U.S.

In May 2021, Wave Loch entered a partnership with Siemens’ Xcelerator portfolio, incorporating digital twin, automation, and IoT solutions. This enabled precise control over waves—up to 400 waves per hour, compared to roughly five per hour in the ocean—and improved efficiency, energy use, and maintenance capabilities.
