= Sovereign (disambiguation) =

A sovereign is the supreme lawmaking authority within a particular jurisdiction.

Sovereign may also refer to:

== Buildings ==
- Sovereign (building), a building in Burnaby, Canada
- The Sovereign (a.k.a. Sovereign Apartments), residential skyscraper on the Upper East Side in Manhattan, New York City, USA.

== Literature ==
- Sovereign (Sansom novel), a 2006 novel by C. J. Sansom
- Sovereign (Dekker and Lee novel), a 2013 novel by Ted Dekker and Tosca Lee

== Music ==
- Sovereign (EP), a 2000 EP and song by Neurosis
- Sovereign (album), a 2014 album by Michael W. Smith
- Sovereign, a 2007 album by Arashk
- Sovereign, a 2009 album by Tenet

== Money ==
- Sovereign (English coin), minted from 1489 to 1604
- Sovereign (British coin), minted from 1817 to the present

== Places ==
- Sovereign, Saskatchewan, a community in Canada

== Ships ==
- Sovereign (1789 ship)
- Sovereign (1793 ship)
- Sovereign (1800 ship)
- Sovereign (yacht), the unsuccessful challenger of the 1964 America's Cup
- C.S. Sovereign, a DP2-type cable ship launched in 1991
- HMS Sovereign, a list of English warships or British Royal Navy ships
- MS Sovereign, a cruise ship of the Royal Caribbean line
- USS Sovereign, a list of United States Navy ships
- Sovereign-class cruise ship, a cruise ship class of Royal Caribbean
- List of ships named Sovereign

=== Fictional ===
- Sovereign Star Destroyer, a class of starship in Star Wars
- Sovereign, the class of the USS Enterprise (NCC-1701-E)

== Film and television ==
- "Sovereign" (Sons of Anarchy), an episode of Sons of Anarchy
- The Sovereign, Hercules's evil alter-ego in Hercules: The Legendary Journeys
- Sovereign, a character on The Venture Bros.
- Sovereign (Marvel Cinematic Universe), a golden-skinned humanoid race
- Sovereign (film), a 2025 film starring Nick Offerman

== Video games ==
- Sovereign (video game), a cancelled Sony Online Entertainment game
- Sovereign, a sentient starship in the Mass Effect series
- The Sovereign, a character in Rise of Incarnates

== Other uses ==
- Sovereign (horse) (born 2016), Irish racehorse
- Cessna Citation Sovereign, a super mid-size business jet
- Sovereign Bank, a bank in the United States
- Sovereign Services, a former insurance company in New Zealand
- Sovereign Pontiff, a title for the Pope
- Sovereign wealth fund, a type of investment fund

== See also ==
- Fount of honour for honours and decorations
- Head of state
- Lady Sovereign (born 1985), MC and performing artist
- Monarch, the sovereign of a monarchy
- Royal Sovereign (disambiguation)
- Sovereign citizen movement
- Sovereign Hill, Victoria, Australia
- Sovereign of the Seas (disambiguation)
- The Sovereigns, a 2017 comic book
- The Sovereigns (band), a 1960s British band
- Sovereignty
- Tribal sovereignty in the United States
