= List of ships named Sovereign =

Ships named Sovereign include:

- Sovereign (1789 ship) was launched at Newcastle in 1789. She traded between London and South Carolina and then as a transport. In 1802 she became a slave ship. She wrecked on 22 January 1804 as she was returning from the West Indies where she had landed her slaves at Trinidad.
- Sovereign (1793 ship) was launched at Shields or Sunderland as a West Indiaman. She made one voyage for the British East India Company (EIC) during which she transported a noted Scottish political prisoner to New South Wales. She then traded with the West Indies and Quebec and was last listed in 1822.
- Sovereign (1800 ship) was launched at Rotherhithe in 1800 as a West Indiaman. The EIC then took her up as an "extra" ship on several contracts; in all she made seven voyages as an East Indiaman for the EIC. After she left the EIC's service in 1817 she continued to trade with India, but under a license from the EIC. She was broken up in 1822.
- C.S. Sovereign, launched in 1991, is a class DP2 type cable ship used for subsea cable installation and repair works.
- MS Sovereign, (formerly MS Sovereign of the Seas) is one of three large cruise ships of the Sovereign class operated by Pullmantur Cruises and formerly by Royal Caribbean International.
- HMS Sovereign, any one of several English and Royal Navy warships
- USS Sovereign, the name of more than one United States Navy ship

== See also ==
- Sovereign-class cruise ship, of the Royal Caribbean line
- Sovereign (yacht), the unsuccessful challenger of the 1964 America's Cup
- Sovereign of the Seas (disambiguation)
- Royal Sovereign (disambiguation)
