= Sovereign class =

Sovereign class may refer to:

- A class of people who are sovereign, who have personal sovereignty
- Sovereign-class cruise ship, of the Royal Caribbean line
- Sovereign-class Federation starship (Star Trek), a class warship starship, see USS Enterprise (NCC-1701-E)
- Sovereign Star Destroyer (Star Wars), a class of Star Destroyer warship starship
- Royal Sovereign-class battleship, a.k.a. Sovereign, British pre-dreadnaught Royal Navy warship class
- Revenge-class battleship, a.k.a. Royal Sovereign or Sovereign, British dreadnaught Royal Navy warship class

== See also ==
- Sovereign (disambiguation)
- Sovereign of the Seas (disambiguation)
- Royal Sovereign (disambiguation)
