= Zanella (surname) =

Zanella is a surname. Notable people with the surname include:

- Christopher Zanella (born 1989), Swiss racing driver
- François Zanella (born 1949), mine worker
- Giacomo Zanella (1820-1888), Italian poet
- Luana Zanella (born 1950), Italian politician
- Rafaela Zanella (born 1986), Brazilian beauty pageant titleholder
- Renato Zanella (born 1961), Italian ballet dancer
- Riccardo Zanella (1875-1959), Italian politician
