= Lis Lauritzen =

Danish captain

- Born: 1971 (age 54–55); Denmark
- Occupation: Cruise ship Captain
- Years active: 1989–

Lis Lauritzen is a Danish cruise ship Captain for Royal Caribbean International. She previously worked in the cargo ship industry.

Lauritzen was born in 1971 in Denmark, to a Japanese mother and a Danish father. Her father had been a sailor for Maersk Line, but gave up that career when Lauritzen and his daughters were born. His stories inspired Lauritzen to pursue a maritime based career. She attended a navigation school in Fanø, Denmark.

== Career ==
Lauritzen's first role on board a ship was while working for J. Lauritzen A/S in June 1989 as a junior seaman. She worked on the gas tanker Kosan for seven months. Afterwards, Lauritzen worked on ships in South America and on the Danish Great Belt ferries. After ten years in the industry, she had completed her Master Mariner certificate and was looking for a fresh challenge.

She joined Royal Caribbean International as first officer on Grandeur of the Seas in November 1998. Laurtizen served in this capacity on several Royal Caribbean cruise ships, including Explorer of the Seas, Radiance of the Seas, Monarch of the Seas, and Jewel of the Seas. Her first command came as a Relief Captain on Jewel of the Seas in 2008, a position she also undertook on Radiance of the Seas.

Lauritzen was named Captain of Vision of the Seas on 10 August 2011. This made her the second ever female Captain for Royal Caribbean International, after Karin Stahre-Janson who was named Captain of Monarch of the Seas in 2007. At the time of her promotion, Lauritzen was one of four female cruise ship captains then employed. She has since been made Captain for Jewel of the Seas. When not at sea, Lauritzen lives in Portugal.
