= MS Majesty =

MS Majesty may refer to the following ships:

- MS Crown Iris, known as Majesty (2017–2018)
- Majesty of the Seas, known as Majesty (2020–2021)
