= Sovereign of the Seas =

Sovereign of the Seas may refer to one of these ships:

- Sovereign of the Seas, an English first-rate warship of 102 guns; later renamed Sovereign in the navy of the Commonwealth of England in 1650 and then Royal Sovereign in the new Royal Navy in 1660
- Sovereign of the Seas (clipper), an 1852 clipper ship built by Donald McKay at Boston
  - A song about the clipper by David Coffin
- MS Sovereign (formerly MS Sovereign of the Seas), the world's largest cruise ship when launched in 1988 for Royal Caribbean International

== See also ==
- List of ships named Sovereign
- Sovereign (disambiguation)
- Royal Sovereign (disambiguation)
