= Yucatán (film) =

2018 comedy film directed by Daniel Monzón

- Theatrical release poster
- Directed by: Daniel Monzón
- Written by: Jorge Guerricaechevarría; Daniel Monzón
- Produced by: Álvaro Augustin; Ghislain Barrois; Jesus Ulled Nadal; Edmon Roch; Javier Ugarte
- Starring: Luis Tosar; Rodrigo de la Serna; Joan Pera; Stephanie Cayo
- Cinematography: Carles Gusi
- Edited by: Mapa Pastor
- Music by: Roque Baños
- Production companies: Buena Vista International Spain, S.A. Gummo Films; Ikiru Films; Telecinco Cinema; La Terraza Films; Yucatán La Película, A.I.E.
- Distributed by: Hispano FoxFilm
- Release date: August 31, 2018 (Spain)
- Running time: 129 minutes
- Country: Spain
- Language: Spanish
- Box office: €5.1 million

Yucatán is a 2018 Spanish comedy film directed by Daniel Monzón from a screenplay by Jorge Guerricaechevarría and Monzón which stars Luis Tosar, Rodrigo de la Serna, Joan Pera, and Stephanie Cayo. The plot follows a group of scammers who embark on a cruise ship to defraud and steal the money of an old baker who recently won millions of euros in the lottery. It was filmed mostly onboard Pullmantur Cruises's MS Sovereign and on location in the ports where the ship docked on its route.

== Plot ==
Clayderman (Rodrigo de la Serna) is a con man who, together with his wife Verónica (Stephanie Cayo), works on board the MS Sovereign as a pianist. He uses his position as a crew member to commit petty crimes against the passengers. In Barcelona, Lucas (another scammer) discreetly enters the ship disguised as a crew member. Almost at the same time, Antonio and his family come on board as regular passengers. Clayderman, Lucas, and Verónica have a past together when they used to "work" as a group, but they split up when both Clayderman and Lucas fell in love with Verónica.

As soon as Clayderman finds out that Lucas is on board, he is sure that his old friend is planning a new scam. He starts to investigate and finds that Antonio, an old baker who recently won 161 million euros in the lottery, is on board with his family. From this moment on, Clayderman, Lucas, and Verónica (assisted by their allies) start a competition to see who can defraud and steal the old man's money first.

== Cast ==
- Luis Tosar as Lucas
- Rodrigo de la Serna as Clayderman
- Joan Pera as Antonio
- Stephanie Cayo as Verónica
- Gloria Muñoz as Carmen
- Alicia Fernández as Leticia
- Adrián Núñez as Brendon
- Txell Aixendri as Alicia

== Production ==
Most of Yucatán's scenes were filmed onboard Pullmantur Cruises's MS Sovereign cruise ship during a transatlantic crossing from Brazil to Spain. The actors and crew embarked on April 10, 2016, in Recife and spent 22 days shooting the film, disembarking in Barcelona. The film team of about 100 lived aboard the ship during this time. The ship carried out its regular activities; the crew and passengers became part of the film, and even appeared as extras in some scenes.

== Release ==
=== Box office ===
Distributed by Hispano FoxFilm, Yucatán was released in Spain on August 31, 2018. In its opening weekend, it grossed $1,240,253, finishing at #1 at the Spanish box office. In its second weekend, it grossed $1,071,148, a dropping to #2. After seven weeks, it had grossed more than €5.1 million in Spain alone, becoming 2018's seventh-highest-grossing Spanish film.

=== Reception ===
Carlos Boyero of El País wrote: "I think I understand what Daniel Monzón has proposed, but the result seems devastating. Nothing works in this weary plot, null of grace, with interpretations that move between the inane and the grotesque". Xavi Sánchez Pons from the website "Sensacine" did not like the film either, giving it two out of five stars with the explanation: "In Yucatan, all of the comedic gags are forced and lack any kind of surprise effect". Sergio F. Pinilla of Cinemanía liked the film, giving it four out of five stars and commenting: "With non-stop fun, there's the glamour of the musical, the absurdity of romantic comedies, [intrigue] and even animated cartoon slapstick in Yucatán". Noel Murray of Los Angeles Times wrote: "From the exotic ports of call to the occasional musical numbers, “Yucatán” is a mostly enjoyable ride. It's meant to be a throwback to glamorous old Hollywood movies.". Jordan Hoffman of TV Guide wrote: "It's virtually impossible not to be amused by this picture. Like the limitless buffet and late show with dancing girls, it's a simple pleasure, but one with guaranteed success." Sergi Sánchez of Fotogramas gives the film four out of five stars and comments: "[Daniel Monzón] has an infinite affection, not condescension, for his characters and a remarkable empathy for the lights and shadows of the human condition".

Yucatán was nominated for one Gaudí Award in the category of "Best Production Manager (Millor Direcció de Producció)".

== See also ==
- List of Spanish films of 2018
