= Santa Maria Assunta e San Martino, Chiampo =

Church building in Chiampo, Italy

Coordinates: 45°32′35″N 11°16′43″E

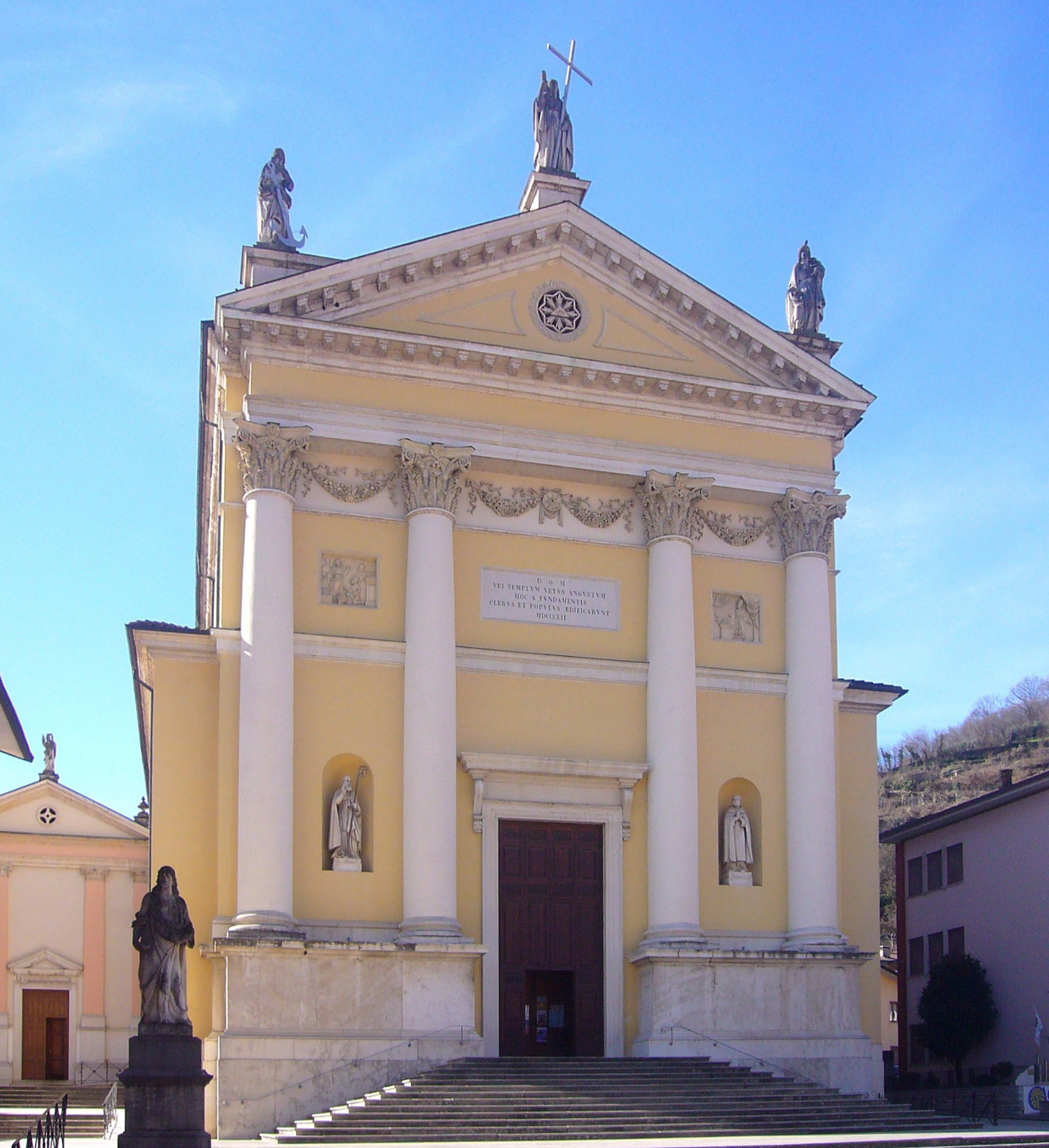
The church in 2024

Santa Maria Assunta e San Martino is a neoclassical-style, Roman Catholic parish church located in Chiampo, province of Vicenza, region of Veneto, Italy.

== History ==
A chapel at the site, dedicated to San Martino, is documented since the fourth century. Over the years the devotion the Virgin grew. By 1460, it was an arcipretale church with other dependant parishes. The church was rebuilt in the early 19th century, and completed in 1852. The interior has a sculpted late-gothic-style ciborium.
