= Karin Stahre-Janson =

Swedish cruise ship captain

- Born: 56–57; Strömstad, Sweden
- Occupation: Cruise ship Captain

Karin Stahre-Janson (born 1956/7) is a Swedish cruise ship captain. When she became the commanding officer of Monarch of the Seas in 2007, it was the first time that a woman had been in command of a "mega" cruise ship. Stahre-Janson has also been placed in command of Serenade of the Seas and Majesty of the Seas.

== Maritime career ==
Karin Stahre-Janson was born in Strömstad, Sweden. In her youth, Stahre-Janson was involved with a sailing club. She attended and graduated from the Chalmers University of Technology in Gothenburg with a bachelor's degree in Nautical science. Her first job on a ship was at the age of 19, when she took a six week long position on a petroleum tanker as a junior seaman.

She initially pursued a career on-board cargo vessels for some nine years but moved to the cruise industry after applying for a vacancy as a superintendent on Royal Caribbean International. She subsequently held staff captain positions on both Serenade of the Seas and Majesty of the Seas.

In 2007, she was named as the captain of Monarch of the Seas, making her the first woman to be placed in command of a modern "mega" cruise ship. By 2010, Stahre-Janson had been placed in command of Serenade of the Seas, when she and the crew provided humanitarian supplies to Saint Lucia following the destruction caused by Hurricane Tomas. She moved to become captain of Majesty of the Seas in late 2013. Stahre-Janson now lives in Gothenburg.

== See also ==
- Lis Lauritzen
