= Global Marine Systems =

British undersea communications system installer

Global Marine Group
- Type: Subsidiary
- Industry: Telecommunications
- Founded: 1850, became independent business in 1999
- Headquarters: Chelmsford, England
- Key people: Simon Hibberd (CEO)
- Parent: Keppel Corporation
- Website: www.globalmarine.group

Global Marine Group (GMG) is a British company specializing in the installation, maintenance and repair of submarine communications cables. The company is a wholly owned subsidiary of the Singaporean conglomerate Keppel Corporation.

Global Marine Group originated from various earlier firms, including the Eastern Telegraph Company, Cable & Wireless (Marine), the General Post Office and BT Marine. Following a series of mergers in the mid 1990s, and the subsequent acquisition of Cable & Wireless (Marine) by Global Crossing in 1999, Global Marine Systems was set up to carry out cable laying and maintenance operations with its own fleet of cable ships and specialised subsea equipment. The company now operates a fleet of seven cable ships.

The CEO of Global Marine Group is Simon Hibberd.

== History ==
It was established in 1999 when Global Crossing purchased British Telecom and Cable & Wireless marine operations and merged them. In 2004, Global Marine Systems was purchased by Bridgehouse Marine and was completely restructured.

In September 2014, GMS was acquired by HC2, and in 2020 by JF Lehman & Partners. Historically, the company has a legacy of over 160 years of cable installation, stemming from the first telegraph cables laid in the 1850s.

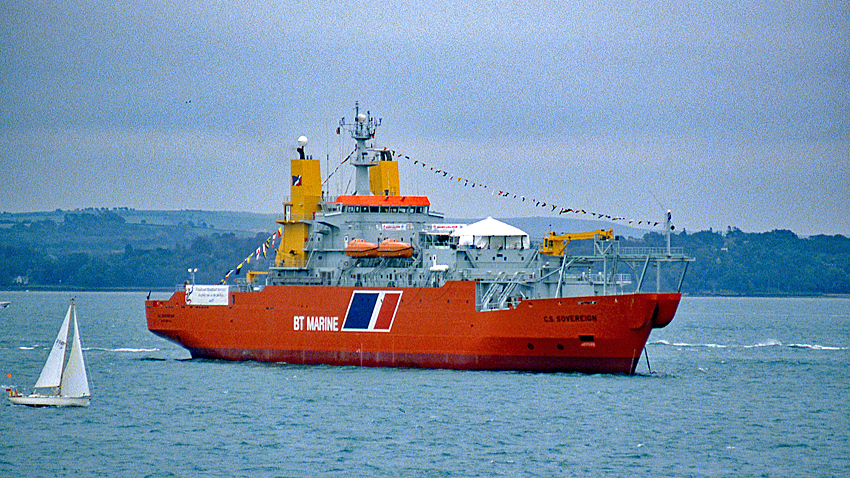
Cable Ship Sovereign at anchor in the Solent

Ships are stationed around the world to support both installation of new cables and the maintenance and protection of existing cables. The company is also involved in joint ventures with China Telecom and Huawei.

Since 2002 Global Marine has become increasingly active in the installation of submarine power cables and gained significant market share in the European Offshore Renewables market, in addition to undertaking a number of large power interconnect projects.

The company was responsible for installing the cables connecting the turbines on a host of windfarm projects including Blythe (one of the first trial farms), Horns Rev 1 (the first major commercial windfarm in Denmark), Thornton Bank, Kentish Flats and others. To support this business Global Marine formed a subsidiary in 2011 called Global Marine Energy.

The development of the energy business included the opening of a new office in Middlesbrough and the construction of a specialist vessel, Cable Enterprise. The subsidiary company was sold to Prysmian Group, the world’s largest cable manufacturer at the time of sale, in September 2012.

Global Marine today focuses primarily on supporting the telecoms, oil & gas and deep sea research markets. In March 2025, GMS was purchased by Keppel Corporation.

Ownership history of Global Marine Systems

== Cable ships fleet ==
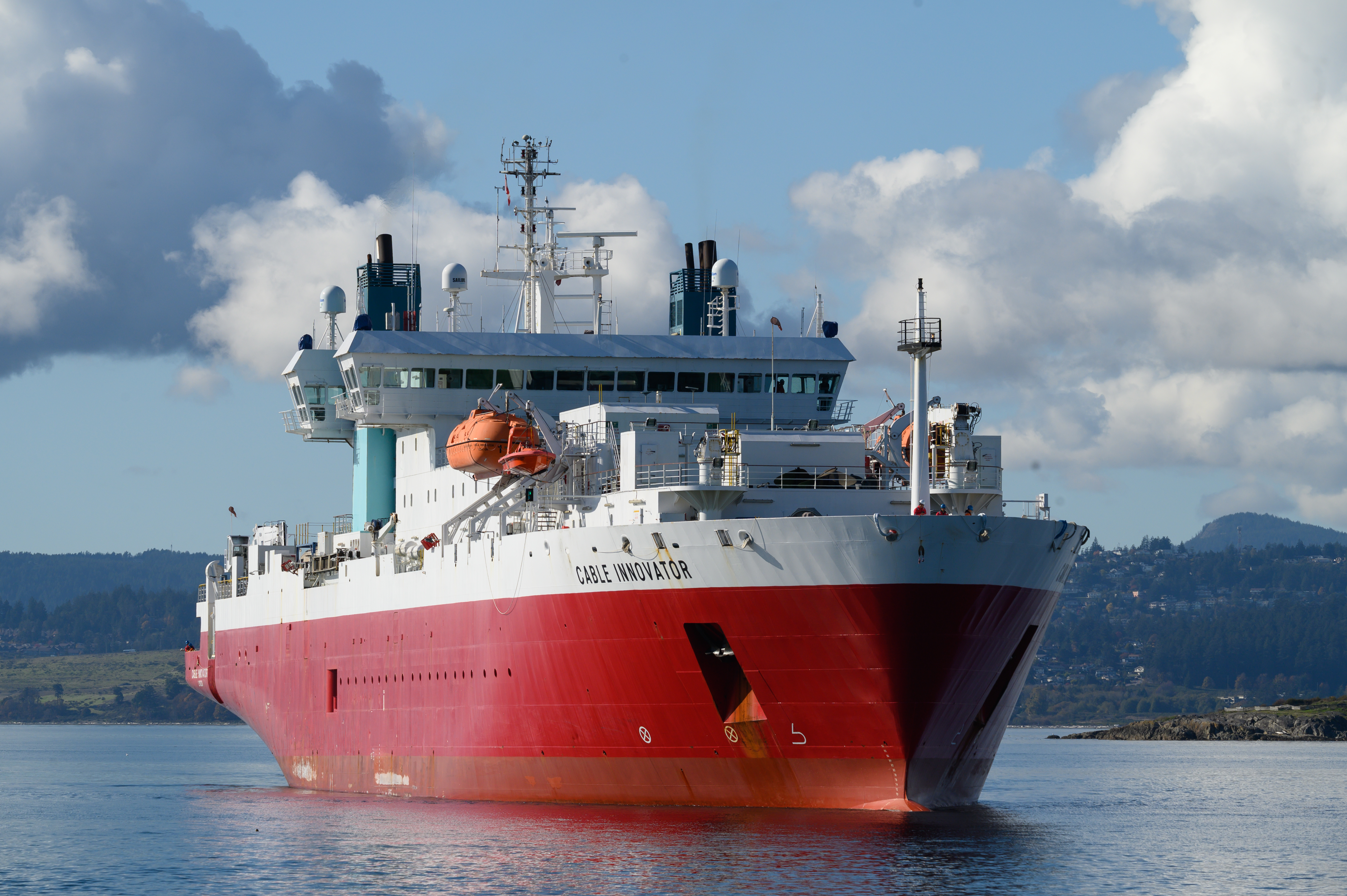
C.S. Cable Innovator arriving at Ogden Point, Victoria in 2024.

As of 2026, Global Marine Group operates a fleet of seven cable ships that undertake the installation, maintenance and repair of submarine telecommunications cables.

The C.S. Sovereign, C.S. Wave Sentinel, C.S. Cable Retriever, C.S. Cable Innovator and C.S. Atlantic Guardian are used for cable maintenance, while the C.S. Clipper and C.S. Recorder are used to lay submarine cables.

Global Marine has announced the signing of a contract with Colombo Dockyard for the construction of a new cable maintenance ship by the end of 2029.

Locations of Global Marine cable depots

To lay, inspect and repair submarine cables, Global Marine Systems also operate a range of submarine vehicles from their vessels, such as the Atlas, ST200 and XT600 remotely operated vehicles (ROV) and Plough M and Hi Plough seabed ploughs.

Global Marine also operate a network of four cable depots around the world - in Portland, United Kingdom; Victoria, Canada; Bermuda and Subic Bay, the Philippines - to support its cable maintenance operations.
