= MV Artania =

Cruise ship

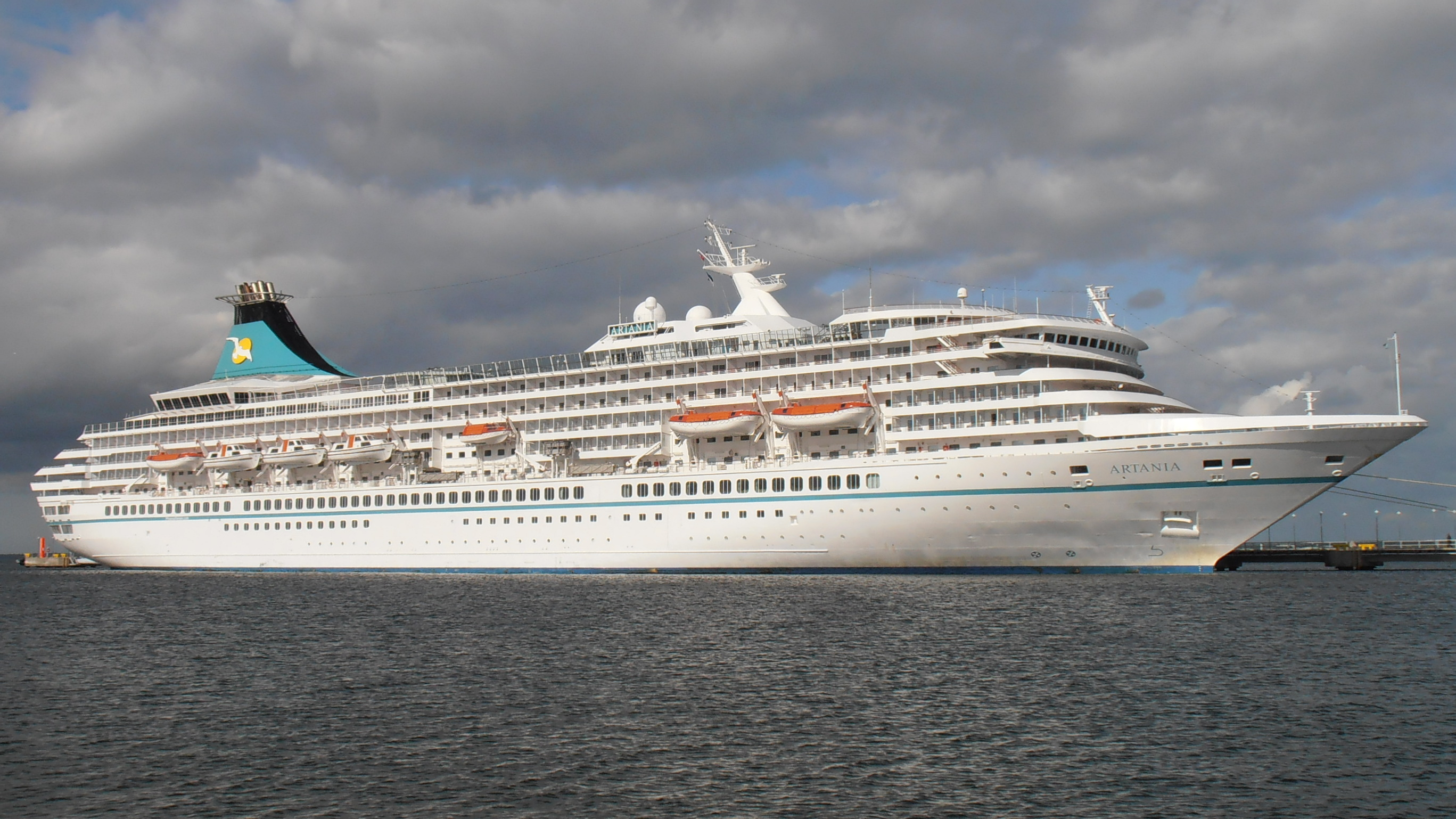
- MV Artania in 2012

History
- Name: Royal Princess (1984–2005); Artemis (2005–2011); Artania (2011–present)
- Owner: P&O Princess Cruises (1984–2003); Carnival Corporation (2003–2009); MS Artania Shipping (2009–present)
- Operator: Princess Cruises (1984–2005); P&O Cruises (2005–2011); Phoenix Reisen (2011–present)
- Port of registry: (United Kingdom) London (1984–2005); Hamilton, Bermuda (2005–2016); (The Bahamas) Nassau, Bahamas (2016–present)
- Builder: Wärtsilä Helsinki Shipyard, Finland
- Cost: $165 million (1984)
- Yard number: 464
- Launched: 18 February 1984
- Christened: 15 November 1984; by Diana, Princess of Wales
- Acquired: 30 October 1984
- Maiden voyage: 19 November 1984
- In service: 19 November 1984
- Identification: Call sign C6CY5; IMO number: 8201480; MMSI number: 311000608
- Status: In service

General characteristics
- Type: Cruise ship
- Tonnage: 44,348 GT; 5,580 DWT
- Length: 766 ft (233 m)
- Beam: 99 ft (30 m)
- Draught: 7.80 m (25 ft 7 in)
- Decks: 13
- Installed power: 4 × Wärtsilä-Pielstick 6PC4-2L; combined 23200 kW
- Speed: 22 knots (41 km/h; 25 mph)
- Capacity: 1,188 (normal); 1,260 (maximum)
- Crew: 537

MV Artania (previously Royal Princess and Artemis) is a cruise ship chartered since 2011 by Phoenix Reisen, a German-based travel agency and cruise ship operator. She was built for Princess Cruises by Wärtsilä at the Helsinki Shipyard, Finland, and was launched on 18 February 1984.

At a ceremony in Southampton, England, on 15 November 1984, the ship was named Royal Princess by Diana, Princess of Wales. After entering service on 19 November 1984, she cruised as Royal Princess until April 2005, when she was transferred to the control of P&O Cruises, and was renamed Artemis. In 2011, she moved to Phoenix Reisen's fleet and was renamed Artania.

In 2020, a COVID-19 outbreak on the ship led to four deaths as of 24 April 2020.

== History ==
=== Royal Princess ===
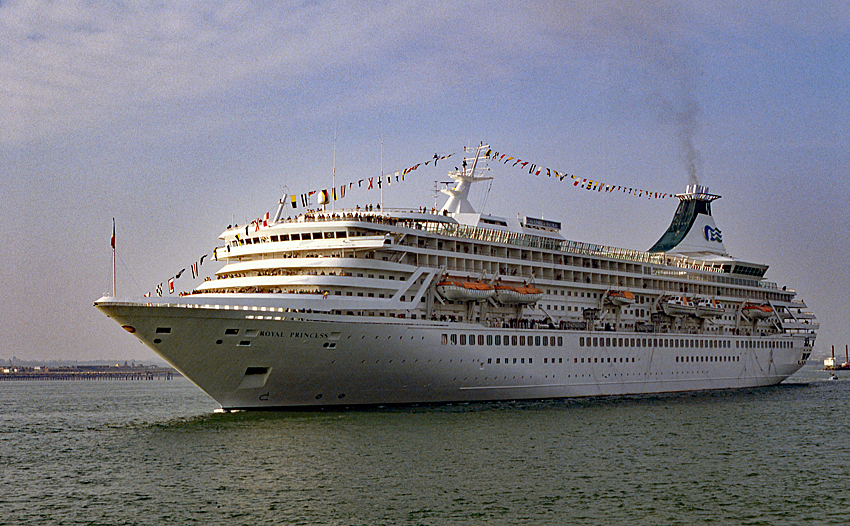
Royal Princess departing Southampton on her maiden voyage

Royal Princess was named by Diana, Princess of Wales at a ceremony in Southampton on 15 November 1984. The ceremony was attended by members of the public, employees of the P&O Princess Group and local and international dignitaries including Mauno Koivisto, President of Finland. The Bishop of Southampton performed a blessing prior to the naming.

The ship was the most expensive passenger ship when built. She does not have any inside cabins, which makes her the first cruise ship to have all outside cabins.

=== Artemis ===
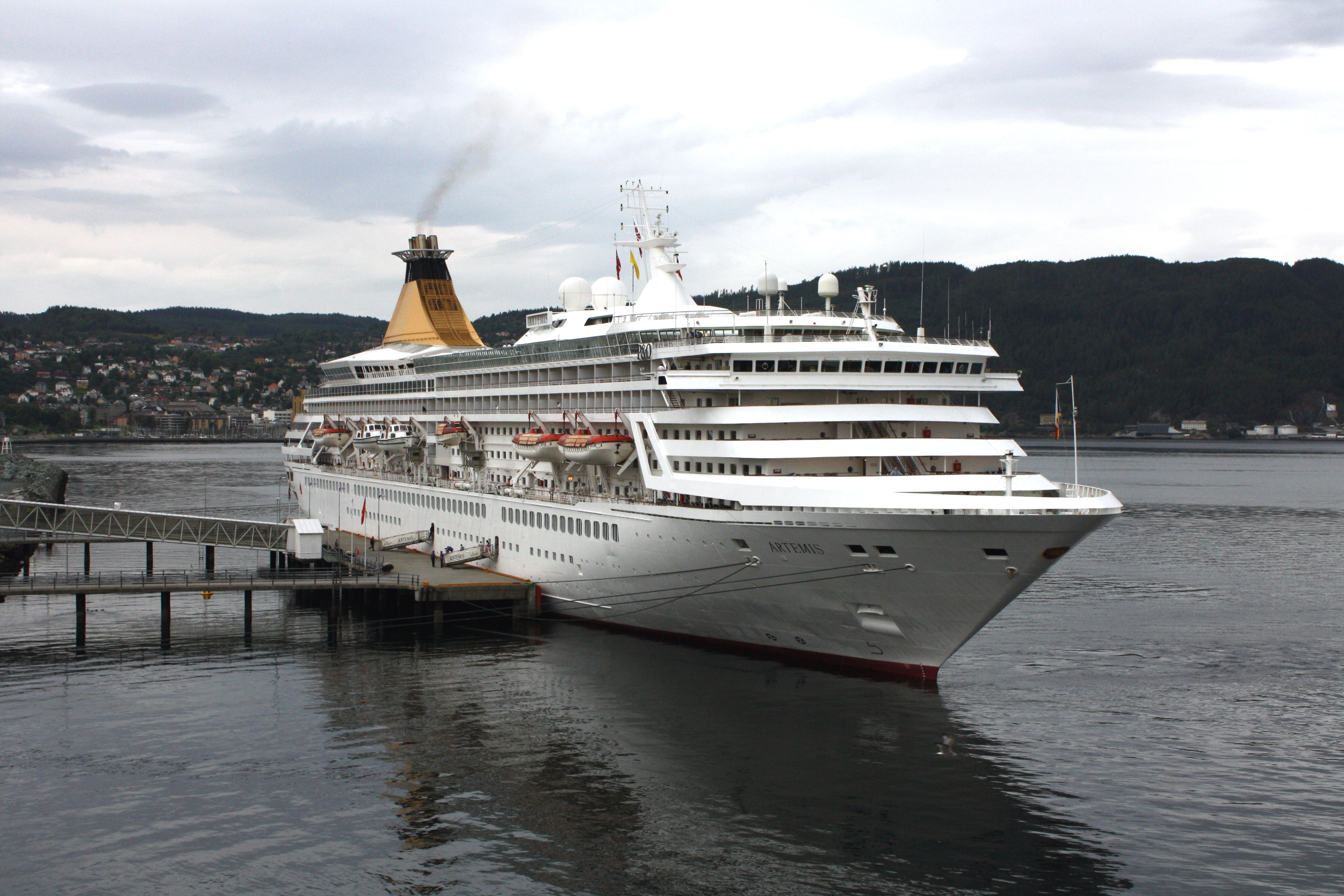
Artemis at Trondheim in August 2009

She was transferred to the P&O fleet in April 2005 and renamed Artemis by Prunella Scales. Artemis was the smallest and oldest ship in the P&O cruises fleet. P&O and Princess Cruises are under the same parent company P&O Princess Cruises since 2000 and were acquired by Carnival Corporation in 2003.

In 2010 British captain Sarah Breton took charge of Artemis, becoming only the second female in the world to command a major cruise ship and the first for P&O, after Karin Stahre-Janson from Sweden, who took charge of Monarch of the Seas of Royal Caribbean International in 2007.

On 22 September 2009, after numerous rumours, it was announced by P&O Cruises that the ship has been sold to a company "MS Artania Shipping" for an undisclosed sum of money. She continued to sail for P&O Cruises until 22 April 2011, when she was chartered to Phoenix Reisen as MV Artania.

=== Artania ===
As of November 2019, the vessel has undergone four overhauls at Lloyd Werft Bremerhaven. The ship has been fitted with new Wärtsilä engines, and 96 additional balconies have been added.

Artania sailed under the flag of Bermuda until October 2016, her port of registry having been Hamilton. From 26 October 2016 Artania, as all other ships of Phoenix Reisen, has sailed under the flag of the Bahamas.

Artania sailed the South Pacific, New Zealand and Oceania for the first part of 2017, docking at Wellington Harbour on 27 February. On 26 October 2017, Artania docked in Halifax, Nova Scotia, Canada, sailing north from New York as part of the autumn New England cruising schedule, departing 27 October to St. John's, Newfoundland and Labrador, Canada, which was its last North American port of call before making a transatlantic crossing to Europe. Cork in Ireland was her first port of call on her way to Hamburg, Germany to commence the remaining 2017 cruise season with ports of call in Europe, Africa and the Indian Ocean.

==== COVID-19 pandemic ====
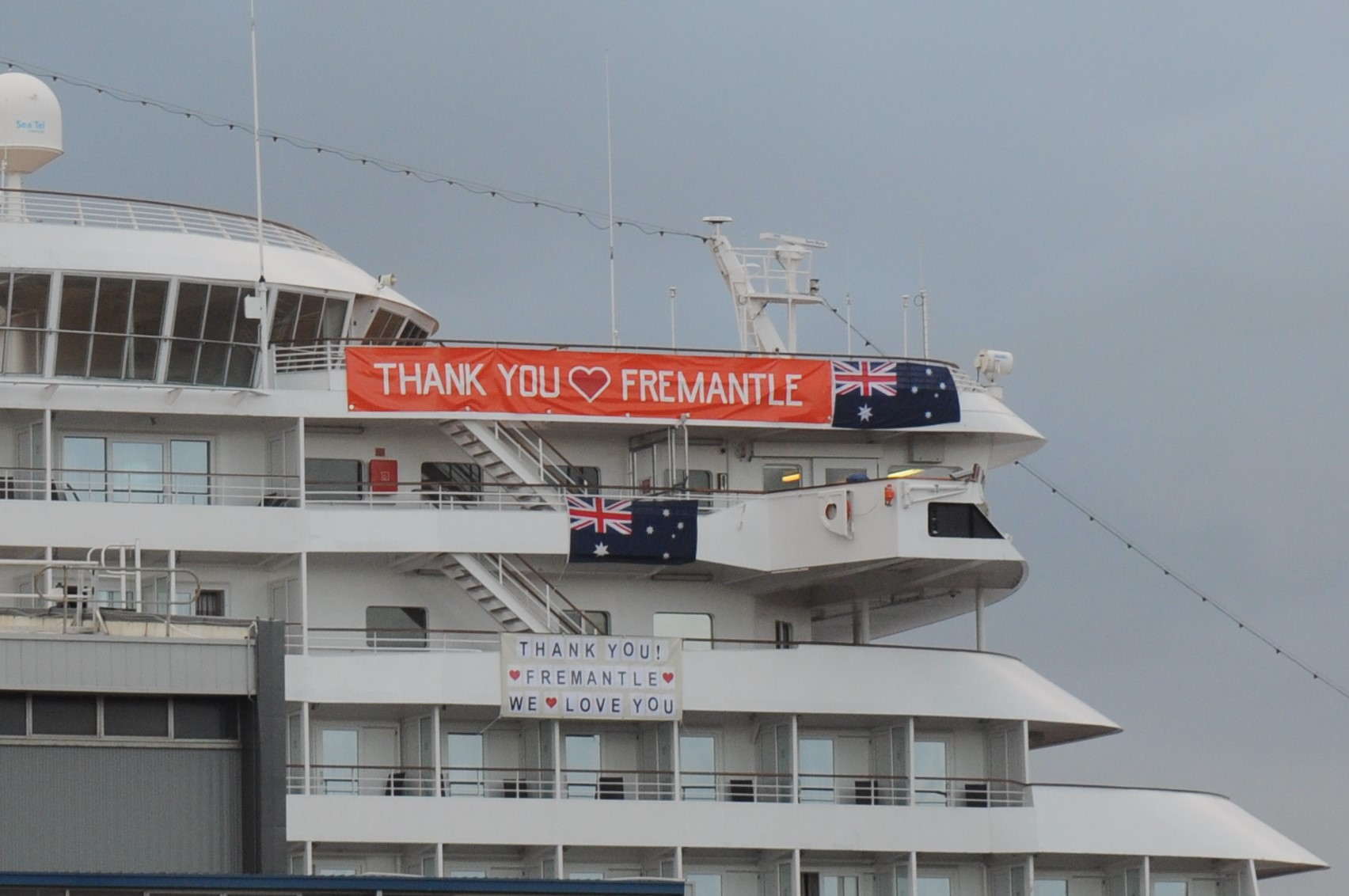
Message of the ship's crew to the city of Fremantle during COVID-19 pandemic

As of 26 March 2020, Artania was anchored off the coast of Western Australia. Health authorities reported seven confirmed coronavirus cases on board. Due to measures taken by the Government of Western Australia to contain the outbreak and, as there were no Australian passengers or crew on board, Artania was required to anchor offshore as Commonwealth forces were organised to refuel and resupply the ship before it departed. The vessel is registered in the Bahamas, and therefore was considered as a foreign vessel.

Artania docked at Fremantle Harbour, Fremantle, on 27 March, and on 28 March 46 people were reported as displaying COVID-19 symptoms. Most of the 850 passengers flew home from Perth Airport to Germany on 28–29 March. 41 passengers and crew tested positive for COVID-19 and were treated in Perth private hospitals such as in Joondalup Health Campus. On 1 April, the ship had 450 crew and about a dozen passengers on board. The Australian Government had directed it to leave port, but the ship demanded to stay another 14 days, presumably so that they could be treated if COVID-19 symptoms developed. According to the Australian Attorney-General, Christian Porter, "there are still 12 passengers on board some of whom are very unwell. And their level of either illness or frailty is such that they cannot get in a plane."

An update on 3 April 2020 by CNN, stated that the cruise line indicated that "16 passengers, plus hundreds of crew members" remained aboard Artania. As of 7 April, two passengers aboard Artania had died from COVID-19, both in Joondalup private hospital. On 17 April, a Filipino crewman of the ship died in the Royal Perth Hospital, the youngest to date fatality in Australia due to COVID-19. On 23 April, it was reported that another passenger of the ship had died from the disease in Sir Charles Gairdner Hospital, another public hospital of Perth.

The outbreak from the ship was responsible for 4 deaths in Western Australia and at least 81 confirmed cases were linked to the ship.

The ship departed Fremantle on 18 April. The ship planned to stop at Indonesia and the Philippines to disembark crew members and then return to Bremerhaven, Germany with the 8 passengers and a skeleton crew of 75 crew members.

The ship arrived at the Port of Tanjung Priok, North Jakarta, Indonesia on 24 April. 56 crew members were disembarked from the ship and sent to quarantine in a hospital. A day later, it was reported that one more member of the crew had disembarked from the ship. Indonesian authorities tested all 57 disembarked Indonesian crew from the ship and 8 of them proved positive.

On 26 April 2020, it was considered that 8 passengers and 346 crew members were still on board when Artania left Indonesian waters. The ship disembarked 236 Filipino crewmen in Manila on 1 May. The ship then headed to Bremerhaven via Singapore.

On 8 June 2020, after approximately six months at sea, Artania docked in the port of Bremerhaven, Germany. All eight passengers on board were able to disembark by midday local time.
