= Chiampo =

- Comune
- Comune di Chiampo
- Location within Italy Location within Veneto
- Coordinates: 45°33′N 11°17′E
- Country: Italy
- Region: Veneto
- Province: Vicenza (VI)
- Frazioni: Arso

Area
  - Total: 22 km^{2} (8.5 sq mi)
- Elevation: 175 m (574 ft)

Population (28 February 2007)
  - Total: 12,618
  - Density: 570/km^{2} (1,500/sq mi)
- Demonym: Chiampesi
- Time zone: UTC+1 (CET)
  - Summer (DST): UTC+2 (CEST)
- Postal code: 36072
- Dialing code: 0444
- Patron saint: Martin of Tours
- Saint day: 11 November
- Website: Official website

Chiampo is a town and comune in the province of Vicenza, Veneto, Italy. It is on SP43.

It houses the 19th-century Roman Catholic church of Santa Maria Assunta e San Martino and was the birthplace of the priest-poet Giacomo Zanella.

== Sources ==
- (Google Maps)
