= Sovereign (1793 ship) =

History

Great Britain
- Name: Sovereign
- Owner: 1794:A. Towers; 1800:Baring & Co.; 1805:Dick & Co.; 1815:R. Mount & Co.
- Builder: Shields, Newcastle-on-Tyne, or Sunderland
- Launched: 1793
- Fate: Last listed 1822

General characteristics
- Tons burthen: 357, or 362 (bm)
- Complement: 24
- Armament: 1795:10 × 3&4-pounder guns; 1810:6 × 6-pounder guns; 1815:12 × 6-pounder guns

Sovereign was launched at Shields in 1793 as a West Indiaman. She made one voyage between 1795 and 1797 for the British East India Company (EIC), to New South Wales and then Bengal. She then resumed trading with the West Indies and was last listed in 1822.

== Career ==
Sovereign enters Lloyd's Register in 1794 with Storey, master, A. Towers, owner, and trade London–Tortola.

On 21 February 1795 Captain George Storey acquired a letter of marque. He then sailed Sovereign to New South Wales and on to Bengal on a voyage for the EIC. She was primarily carrying stores for Port Jackson, but she was also transporting one convict, Joseph Gerrald, a political reformer and one of the "Scottish Martyrs".

Storey and Sovereign sailed from The Downs on 24 May. She reached Rio de Janeiro on 24 July and arrived at Port Jackson on 5 November. Gerrald survived the journey but he was ill with tuberculosis and died in 1796.

Sovereign left on 17 December, bound for Bengal. By 7 March 1796 she was at Sulu. She reached Penang on 1 April and arrived at Calcutta on 10 May.

On 12 May the Calcutta Gazette published Storey's account of conditions at Port Jackson. Campbell, Clarke and Co. were Sovereign's agents at Calcutta. On 30 May the country ship Begum Shaw, Gavin (or Guy) Hamilton master and owner, arrived at Calcutta from Coringa. Campbell and Clark purchased her, retaining Hamilton as master. They renamed her Sydney Cove, loaded her with a variety of produce and goods, and sent her to Port Jackson on speculation. She wrecked on the way.

Homeward bound, Sovereign was at Kedgeree on 15 July and the Cape of Good Hope on 7 October. She reached Saint Helena on 3 November and Cork on 8 January 1797, before arriving back at The Downs on 31 January.

On her return Sovereign resumed trading with the West Indies. Lloyd's Register for 1798 gives her master as P. Aylward, changing to S. Chapman, her owner as Baring & Co., and her trade as London–Jamaica.

There is a report that Sovereign, Captain Richarson, was wrecked on 24 January 1804 at Ballycotton, County Cork, with heavy loss of life. She was on a voyage from Trinidad and Tortola to London. However, this was a different Sovereign.

Year	Master	Owner	Trade	Source & notes
1800	Chapman	Baring & Co.	London–Jamaica	Lloyd's Register (LR)
1805	Cunningham; G. Sale	Dick & Co. Donaldson & Co.	Dublin–Jamaica; London–Jamaica	LR
1810	A. Smith	Q. Dick	London–St Croix	LR; underwent a good repair in 1805
1813	A. Smith	Q. Dick	London–St Croix	LR; underwent a good repair in 1805

Sovereign, of 362 tons (bm), launched at Shields in 1793, is no longer listed in Lloyd's Register in 1814. However, the Register of Shipping shows a Sovereign, A. Smith, master, Dick & Co. owners, and trade London-St Croix. Lloyd's Register has the same information. The Register of Shipping describes this Sovereign as being of 378 tons (bm), and of French origin. Lloyd's Register describes her as being of 377 tons, built at "Rochelle", and launched in 1809.

In 1815, Lloyd's Register lists two Sovereign, one of 377 tons (bm), and one of 362 tons (bm). (The Register of Shipping lists only the French origin Sovereign.) The 362-ton Sovereign has a launch year of 1794, and location of Sunderland.

Year	Master	Owner	Trade	Source & notes
1815	W. Kind	R. Mount	London−Surinam	LR; underwent a thorough repair in 1805
1820	R. Dawson	R. Mount	London–Quebec	LR

== Fate ==
Sovereign is last listed in 1822 with information unchanged since 1820.
