= MS Monarch =

Scrapped cruise ship

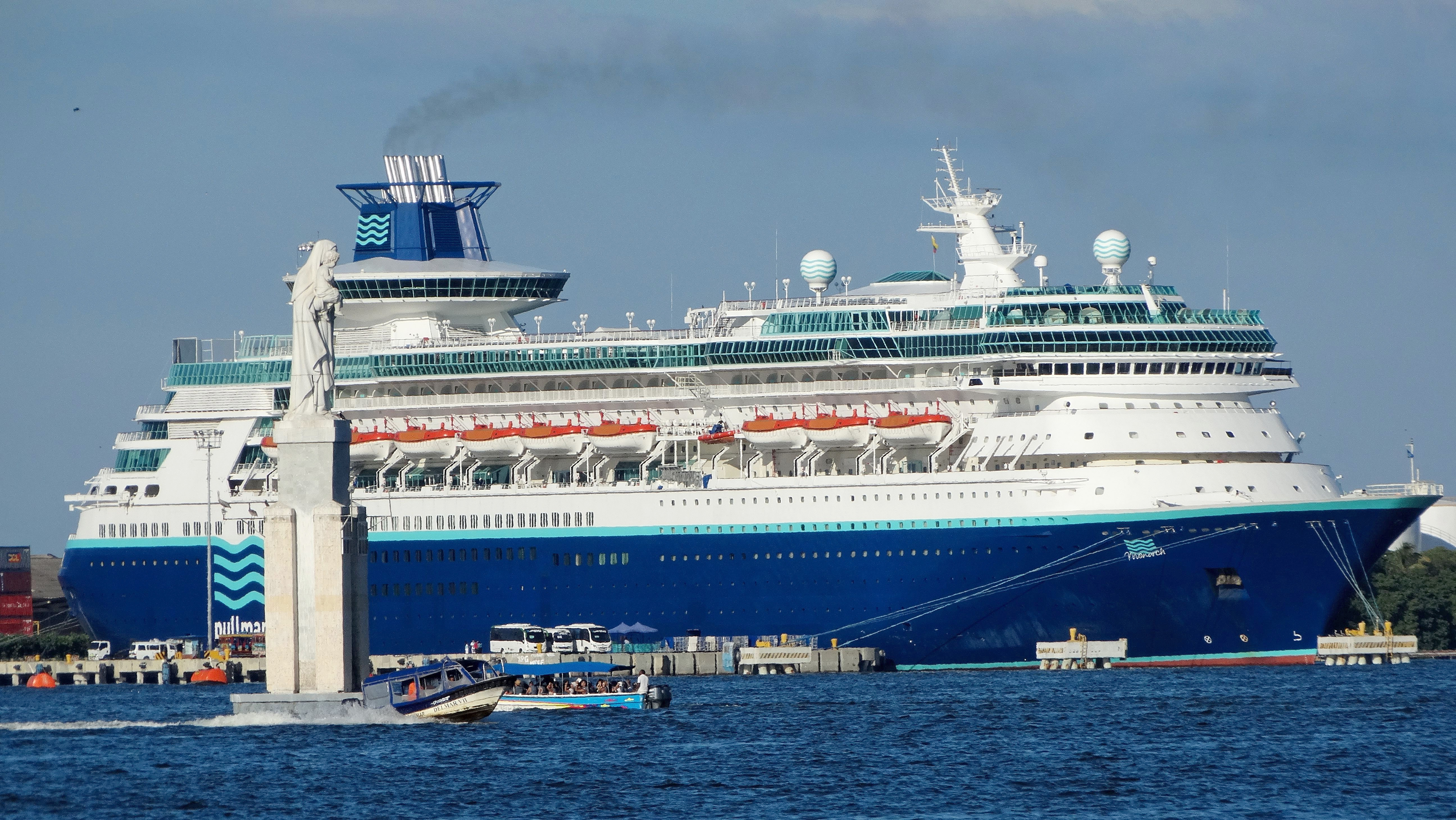
- Monarch in Cartagena, Colombia

History
- Name: 1991–2013: Monarch of the Seas; 2013–2020: Monarch
- Owner: Royal Caribbean International
- Operator: 1991–2013: Royal Caribbean International; 2013–2020: Pullmantur Cruises
- Port of registry: 1991–2004: Oslo Norway; 2005–2013: Nassau, Bahamas; 2013-2020: Valletta, Malta
- Route: Southern Caribbean
- Builder: Chantiers de l'Atlantique; Saint-Nazaire, France
- Yard number: A30
- Laid down: July 31, 1989
- Launched: September 22, 1990
- Acquired: October 15, 1991
- Maiden voyage: November 11, 1991 as Monarch of the Seas; April 27, 2013 as Monarch
- In service: 1991-2020
- Out of service: 2020
- Identification: Call sign 9HA3314; IMO number: 8819500; MMSI number: 229415000
- Fate: Scrapped in Aliağa in 2021

General characteristics
- Class & type: Sovereign-class cruise ship
- Tonnage: 73,937 GT; 47,505 NT
- Length: 268.32 m (880 ft 4 in)
- Beam: 36.0 m (118 ft 1 in)
- Draft: 7.55 m (24 ft 9 in)
- Decks: 12
- Installed power: Four Pielstick-Alsthom diesel engines, 21,840 kW (29,288 hp) (combined)
- Propulsion: Two controllable pitch propellers; Two bow thrusters
- Speed: 22 knots (41 km/h; 25 mph)
- Capacity: 2,744 passengers

MS Monarch (formerly Monarch of the Seas) was the second of three Sovereign-class cruise ships owned by Royal Caribbean International. The ship was built in 1991 at the Chantiers de l'Atlantique shipyards in Saint-Nazaire, France. Beginning on April 1, 2013, Monarch was operated by RCCL's Pullmantur Cruises, before being sold for scrap in 2020 following Pullmantur's closure.

At 73,941 GT, Monarch was one of the largest cruise ships in the world at time of her completion. She could carry up to 2,744 passengers.

== History ==
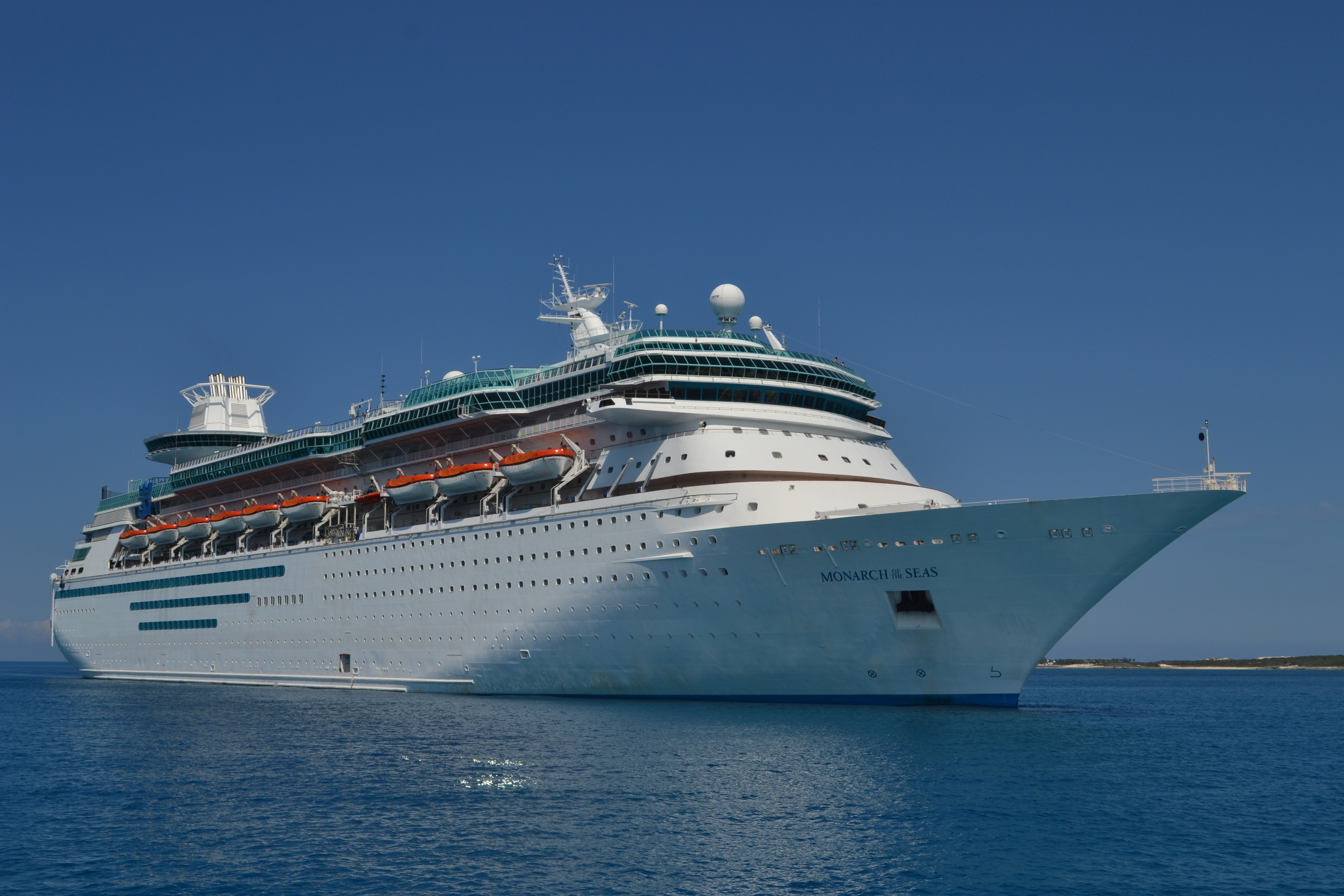
Monarch of the Seas with Royal Caribbean livery anchored off Coco Cay.

About a third of the ship burned during its completion afloat in 1990, due to an accident involving some welding equipment. At the time, the cost to make repairs was so significant that it was not clear if the ship could be repaired. After consideration, the ship was placed in dry dock and the damaged bow section was removed. This section was then rebuilt and the metal recycled to construct the next ship of the class, Majesty of the Seas.

Monarch had an outdoor basketball court, two shuffleboard courts, and a rock climbing wall. There were also two full-sized salt water pools. She was refurbished in May 2003 to add the rock-climbing wall. The fitness center, spa and children's area were also enlarged. Prior to being retired from the Royal Caribbean International fleet, Monarch of the Seas (as she was then called) sailed to the Bahamas out of Port Canaveral, Florida.

In 2007, Monarch became the first major cruise ship in the world to be captained by a woman, the Swede Karin Stahre-Janson, who remained the only one until 2010 when the British captain Sarah Breton took charge of MS Artemis of P&O Cruises.

On 1 April 2013, after serving for Royal Caribbean International for 22 years, Monarch was transferred to Spain's Pullmantur Cruises, joining her sister ship MS Sovereign. Before sailing for Pullmantur, Monarch underwent another refurbishment to some of her cabins, casino and shops. She began sailing year-round in the Southern Caribbean on 27 April 2013.

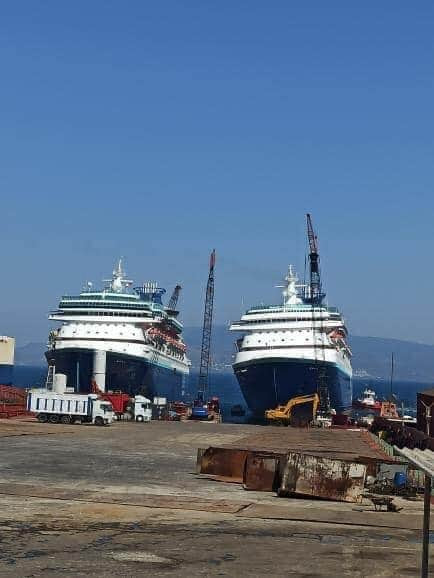
Monarch (left) and Sovereign (right) beached for scrapping in Aliağa, Turkey in July 2020.

In 2020, amid the COVID-19 pandemic, Monarch and MS Sovereign were placed into "cold lay-up" and Pullmantur Cruises filed for financial reorganization. According to reports, the interiors of the ships were stripped of "everything of value". Pullmantur Cruises announced that MS Monarch, MS Sovereign and MS Horizon were to be sold to breakers for scrap in Aliağa, Turkey. She was beached on 22 July 2020 and scrapping started on 5 April 2021 with the removal of the pilot's cabinet.

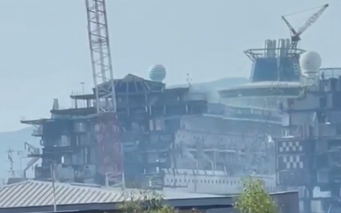
Monarch being scrapped in Aliaga, Turkey in May 2021.

== Incidents ==
=== Grounding off St. Maarten ===
After evacuating a sick passenger at Philipsburg, Sint Maarten, the Netherlands Antilles on December 15, 1998, Monarch of the Seas grazed a reef while departing, opening a gash along the starboard hull 40 by 2 metres (131 by 7 ft) in size. The ship started taking on water and began to sink by the bow. Three of its watertight compartments were completely flooded and several others partially flooded.

The ship was intentionally grounded on a sandbar to prevent further sinking. All passengers were evacuated by crew members and local tender operators. There were no deaths. The grounding breached two of the ship's diesel fuel tanks and an overflow tank causing a small fuel spill of approximately 380 litres (100 US gal). There was also severe damage to the ship. A joint investigation by the Norwegian Maritime Investigator and the United States Coast Guard found that the accident was due to "…a myriad of human performance deficiencies." Reports also indicate that navigation out of the port was done visually rather than using electronic navigation and that the relocation of a vital buoy was not reflected on charts.

The ship was drydocked for repairs for three months at Atlantic Marine's Mobile, Alabama, facilities. 114 of the ship's compartments had to be cleaned. The work also included replacement of machinery, 460 tons of shell plating, and 29 km (18 mi) of electrical wiring.

American comedian John Pinette was aboard the ship at the time of the incident, referencing it in his 2005 DVD 'I Say Nay Nay'.

=== Gas leak ===
While docked at the Port of Los Angeles in August 2005, maintenance on a sewage pipe caused a small amount of raw sewage and an unknown amount of hydrogen sulfide gas to escape. Three crew members were killed and 19 others were injured. Reports said that the deaths were almost instantaneous as the crew members were not wearing breathing apparatus at the time.

=== Captain's death ===
Thirty-eight-year-old Captain Jørn Rene Klausen was found dead in his stateroom aboard Monarch early the morning of January 30, 2006. The ship was returning to Los Angeles from a three-night cruise to Ensenada, Mexico. According to reports, the death appeared to be from natural causes.

=== Coronavirus pandemic ===
On 14 March 2020, Panama repatriated 1,504 Colombian tourists from the cruise ship Monarch due to coronavirus fears. Since the port of Cartagena, Colombia was closed, the people had to fly from Colón, Panama.

On 17 April 2020, a Honduran crew member died of the virus in a hospital in Panama City. He had been medically evacuated after having trouble breathing, and tested positive at the hospital.
