= Giacomo Zanella =

Italian poet

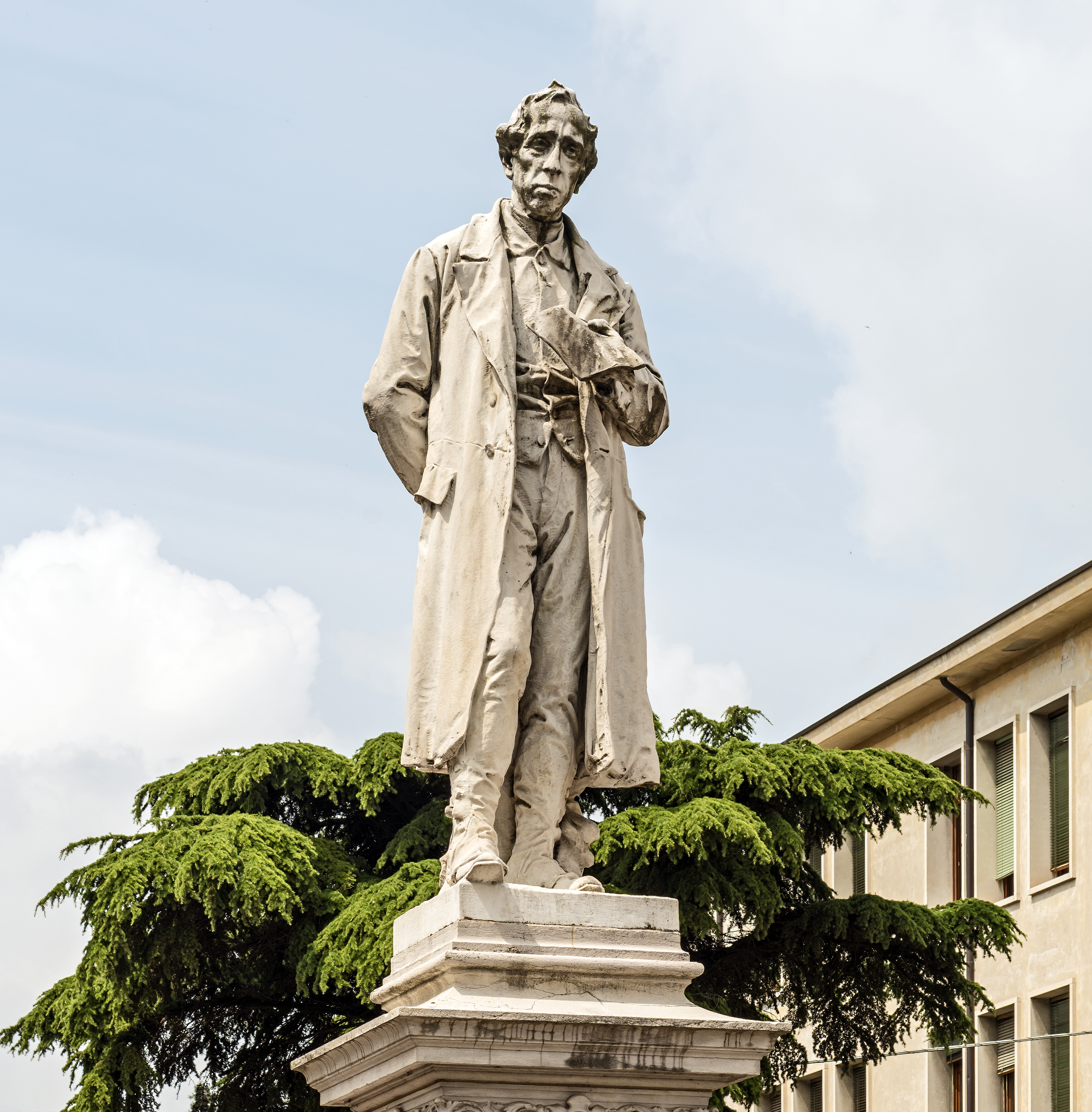
Giacomo Zanella in Vicenza

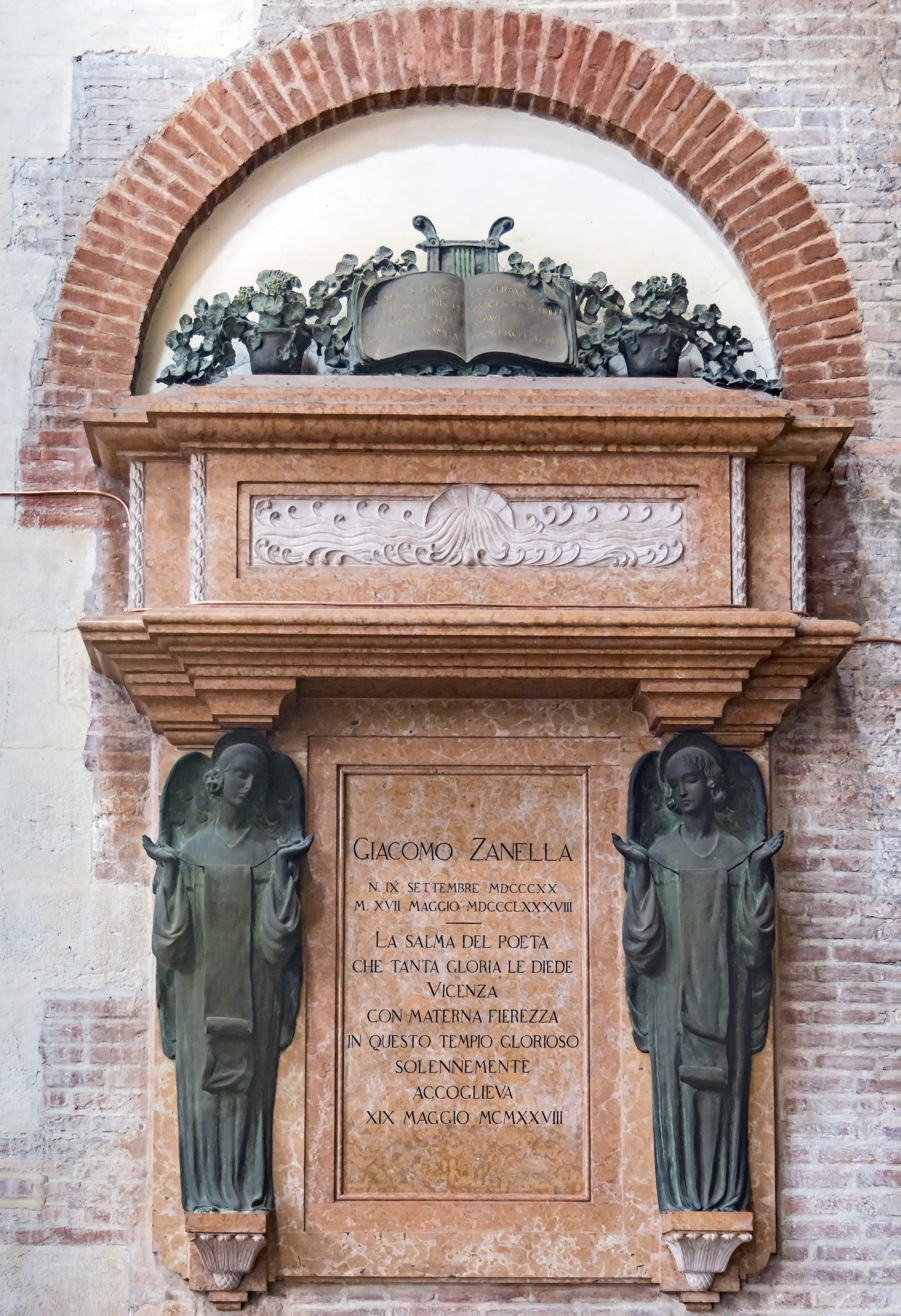
Monument to Giacomo Zanella

Giacomo Zanella (9 September 1820 – 17 May 1888) was an Italian poet.

== Biography ==
He was born at Chiampo, near Vicenza, and was educated for the priesthood. After his ordination he became professor at the lyceum of his native place, but his patriotic sympathies excited the jealousy of the Austrian authorities, and although protected by his diocesan, he was compelled to resign in 1853. After the liberation of Venetia, the Italian government conferred upon him a professorship at Padua, and he achieved distinction as a poet on the publication of his first volume of poems in 1868.

In 1872 grief for the death of his mother occasioned a mental malady, which led to the resignation of his professorship. After his complete and permanent recovery he built himself a villa on the bank of his native river, the Astichello, and lived there in tranquility until his death in 1888.

His last published volume contains a series of sonnets addressed to the river, resembling Wordsworth's "Sonnets to the Duddon,"; and a blank verse idyll, "Il Pettirosso" ("The Redbreast"), bearing an equally strong, though equally accidental, resemblance to the similar compositions of Coleridge. He has also written an ode to Dante, and that on the opening of the Suez Canal.

Of his other compositions, the most individual are those in which, deeply impressed by the problems of his day, he has sought to reconcile science and religion, especially the fine dialogue between John Milton and Galileo, where the former, impressed by Galileo's predictions of the intellectual consequences of scientific progress, resolves "to justify the ways of God to man." Zanella was a broad-minded and patriotic ecclesiastic, and his character is justly held in equal honor with his poetry, which, if hardly to be termed powerful, wears a stamp of peculiar elegance and finish, and asserts a place of its own in modern Italian literature.
