= Majesty of the Seas (mini) =

French model ship

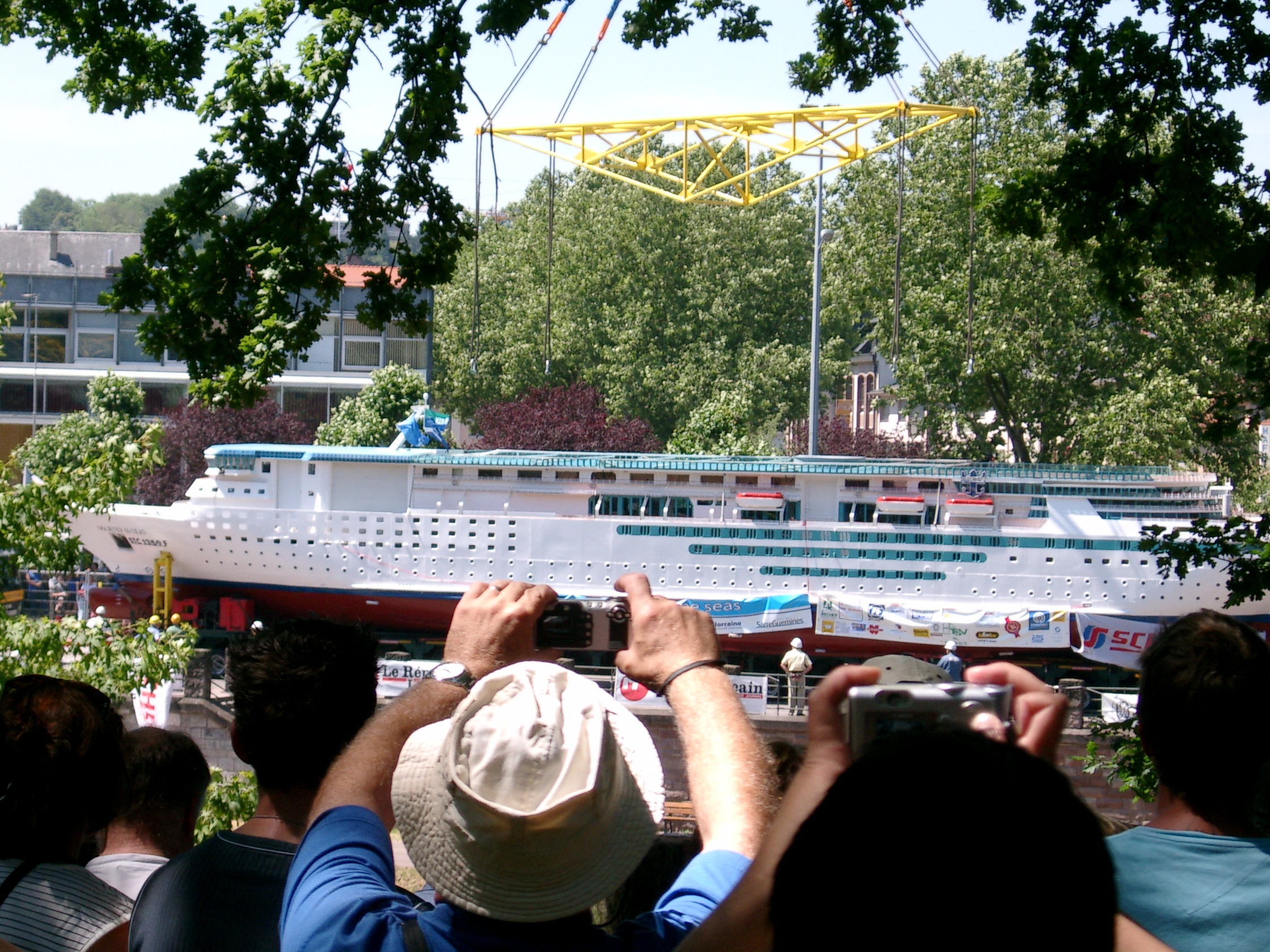
Launch of the mini Majesty of the Seas

The mini Majesty of the Seas is a model ship constructed in Morsbach, France, by François Zanella.

The vessel is a 1/8th scale model of Royal Caribbean International's 1992 cruise ship, Majesty of the Seas (also built in France, by Chantiers de l'Atlantique). The mini Majesty is 33.5 metres in length, with a width of 4.75 metres and a draft of 1.06 metres. The model has a displacement of 90 tons. In addition to being a scale replica model, the mini Majesty is a fully functional canal boat. The vessel's draft is small enough to permit admittance to most European canals, although in some cases the height of the ship needs to, and can, be modified.

== History ==
It took François Zanella, a mine builder, 11 years to build the model, beginning in 1993. The model was built on land opposite his home in Morsbach, which he purchased specifically for the project. After construction was completed in June 2005, the model was transported to Sarreguemines to be launched and christened. François Zanella's fame in France stemmed from the show Thalassa on France 3, which followed his activities during the construction period. He died in 2015.

In 2026, the mini Majesty of the Seas, in a degraded state, was still docked at the Sarreguemines marina.
