= USS Sovereign =

USS Sovereign may refer to more than one United States Navy ship:

- USS Sovereign (1855), a steamer in commission from 1862 to 1865
- USS Sovereign (SP-170), a patrol vessel in commission from 1918 to 1919
