= Majesty of the Seas =

Sovereign class cruise ship

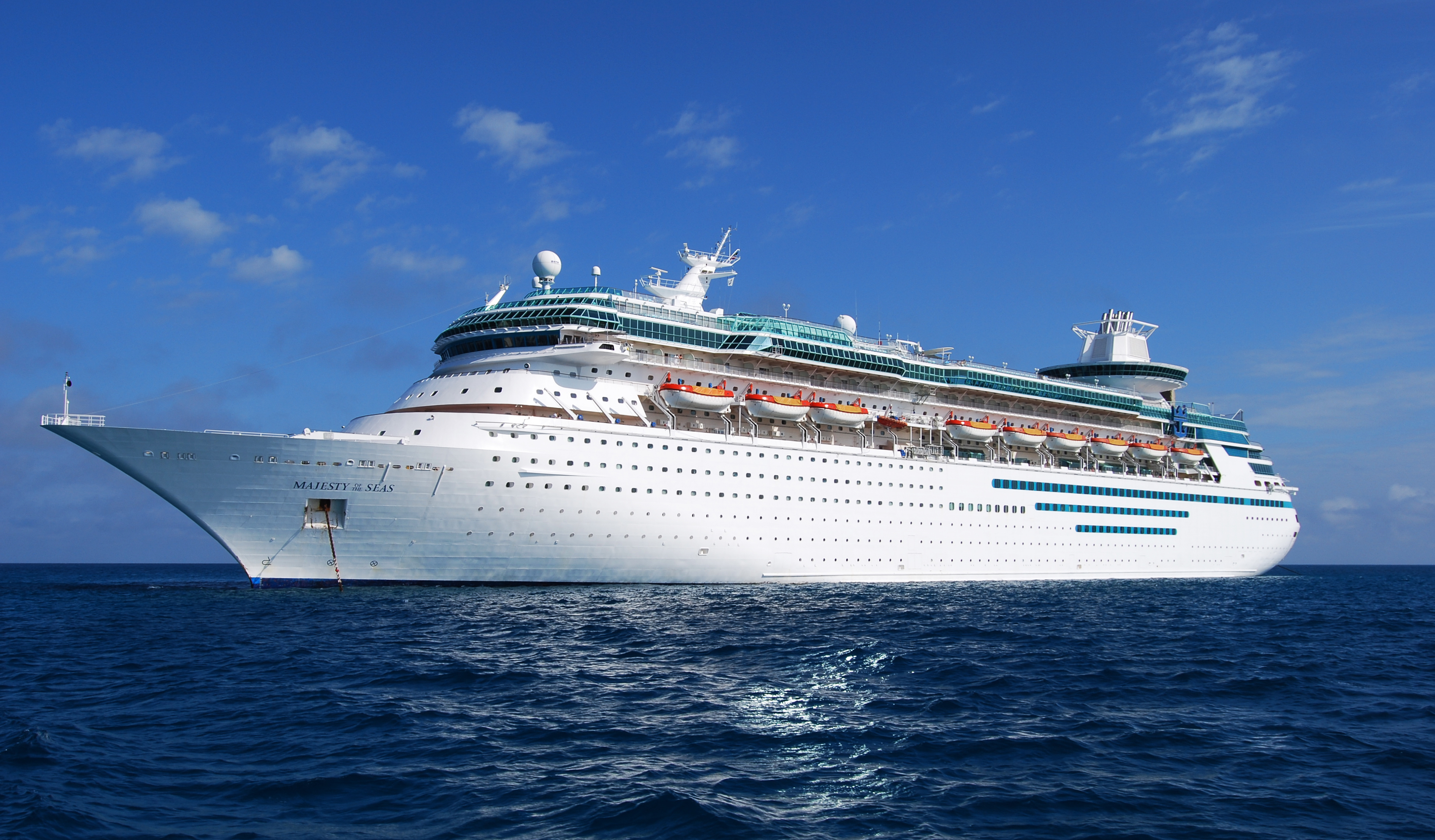
- Majesty of the Seas anchored off CocoCay in 2009

History

Bahamas
- Name: 1992–2021: Majesty of the Seas; 2021: Majesty; 2021–Present: Majesty of the Oceans
- Owner: Royal Caribbean International (1992-2020); Seajets (2020-present)
- Operator: Royal Caribbean International (1992-2020)
- Port of registry: 1992–2005: Oslo, Norway; 2005–present: Nassau, Bahamas
- Builder: Chantiers de l'Atlantique (St. Nazaire, France)
- Launched: 21 September 1991
- Christened: Queen Sonja of Norway
- Completed: 26 April 1992
- Maiden voyage: 4 April 1992
- In service: 1992
- Out of service: 2020
- Refit: 12 January 2007
- Identification: Call sign: C6FZ8; IMO number: 8819512; MMSI number: 311734000; DNV ID: 16765
- Status: Laid up in Eleusis Bay

General characteristics
- Class & type: Sovereign-class cruise ship
- Tonnage: 73,941 GT
- Length: 880 ft (270 m)
- Beam: 106 ft (32 m)
- Draught: 28 ft (8.5 m)
- Decks: 13 passenger decks
- Speed: 22 knots (41 km/h; 25 mph)
- Capacity: 2,767 passengers
- Crew: 833

Majesty of the Seas is a Sovereign-class cruise ship formerly owned and operated by Royal Caribbean International. She was built at the Chantiers de l'Atlantique shipyards in Saint-Nazaire, France, weighing 73,941 gross tons. She was placed in service on 26 April 1992 offering 4- and 5-night Caribbean cruises, sailing from Florida. Her Godmother is Queen Sonja of Norway. In December 2020 she was sold to Seajets, renamed Majesty and laid up in Greece. Subsequently renamed Majesty of the Oceans, she is the only remaining Sovereign-class ship, although still out of service as of August 2026.

== Description ==
The ship has a casino and 11 passenger elevators, two of which are glass-walled, various bars, two swimming pools, four hot tubs, a basketball court, and a rock climbing wall. The ship holds 2,350 guests at double occupancy and a maximum of 2,767 guests, and 833 crew members.

== Service history ==
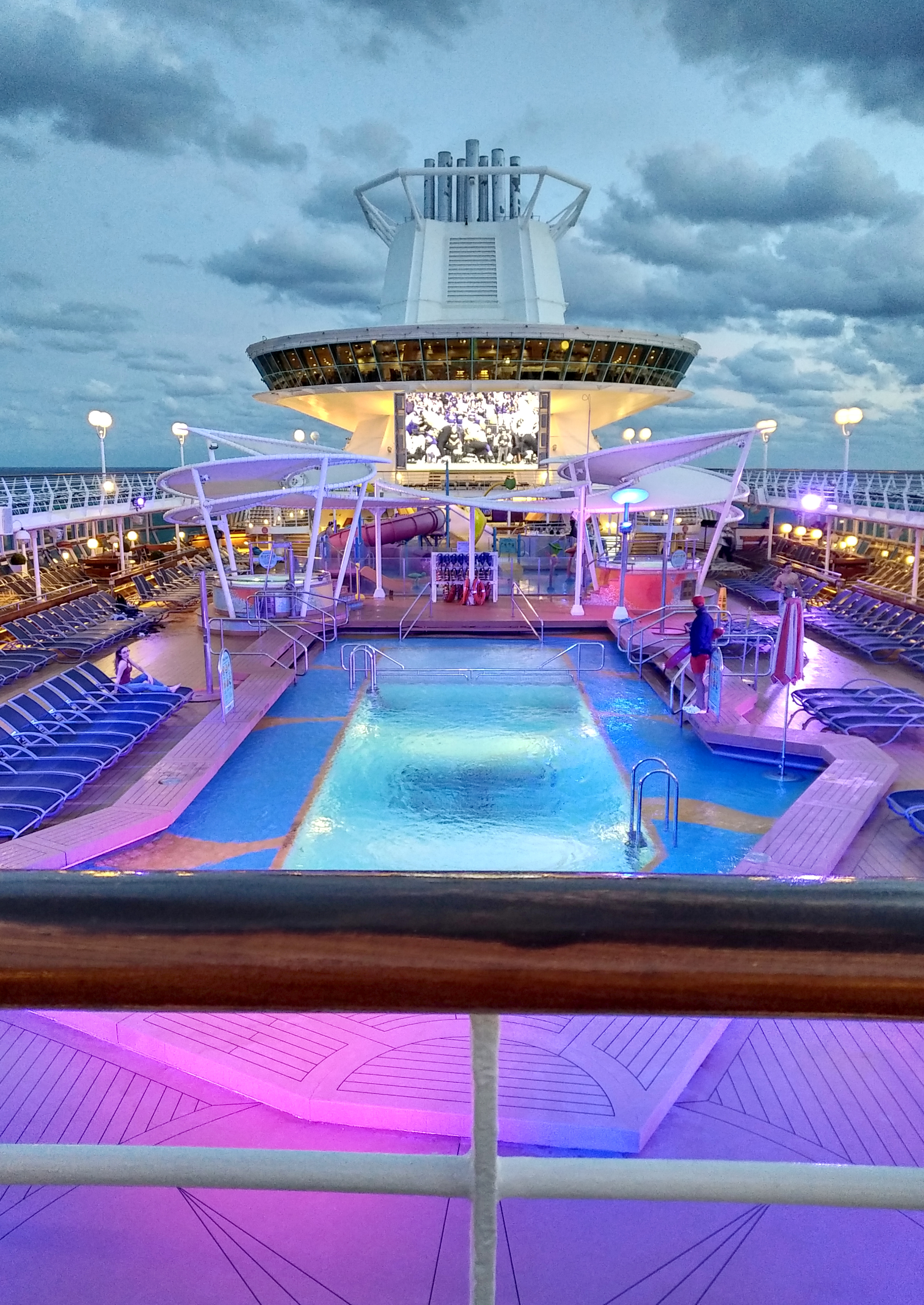
The pool deck at sunset in 2018

On 12 January 2007, Majesty of the Seas entered a 4-week dry-dock period where she underwent a multimillion-dollar refurbishment of the pool decks, all public areas, restaurants, shops, centrum and cabins.

Plans to transfer Majesty of the Seas to Pullmantur in 2016 had been announced on 21 November 2014, however in July 2015, Royal Caribbean reversed those plans, instead stating that Majesty of the Seas would stay with Royal Caribbean International.

Majesty of the Seas was dry-docked after her 29 April 2016 cruise to receive several upgrades, a children's water play area, a poolside movie screen, and modifications to the casino.

=== COVID-19 pandemic ===
During the COVID-19 pandemic, the CDC reported, as early as 22 April 2020, that at least one person who tested positive for SARS-CoV-2 was symptomatic while on board. From 14 March 2020 the ship's cruising operations were suspended due to the COVID-19 pandemic.

== Sale to SeaJets ==
In December 2020, Royal Caribbean sold Majesty of the Seas to Seajets who renamed her Majesty. Seajets renamed the ship Majesty of the Oceans in April 2021, while still laid up at Piraeus. The ship is currently on sale for $40,000,000.00.

== Scale model ==
A 1/8th scale model of Majesty of the Seas was built in Morsbach, by François Zanella. The model was launched in 2005 and performs river cruises in and around Paris, France.
