= C.S. Sovereign =

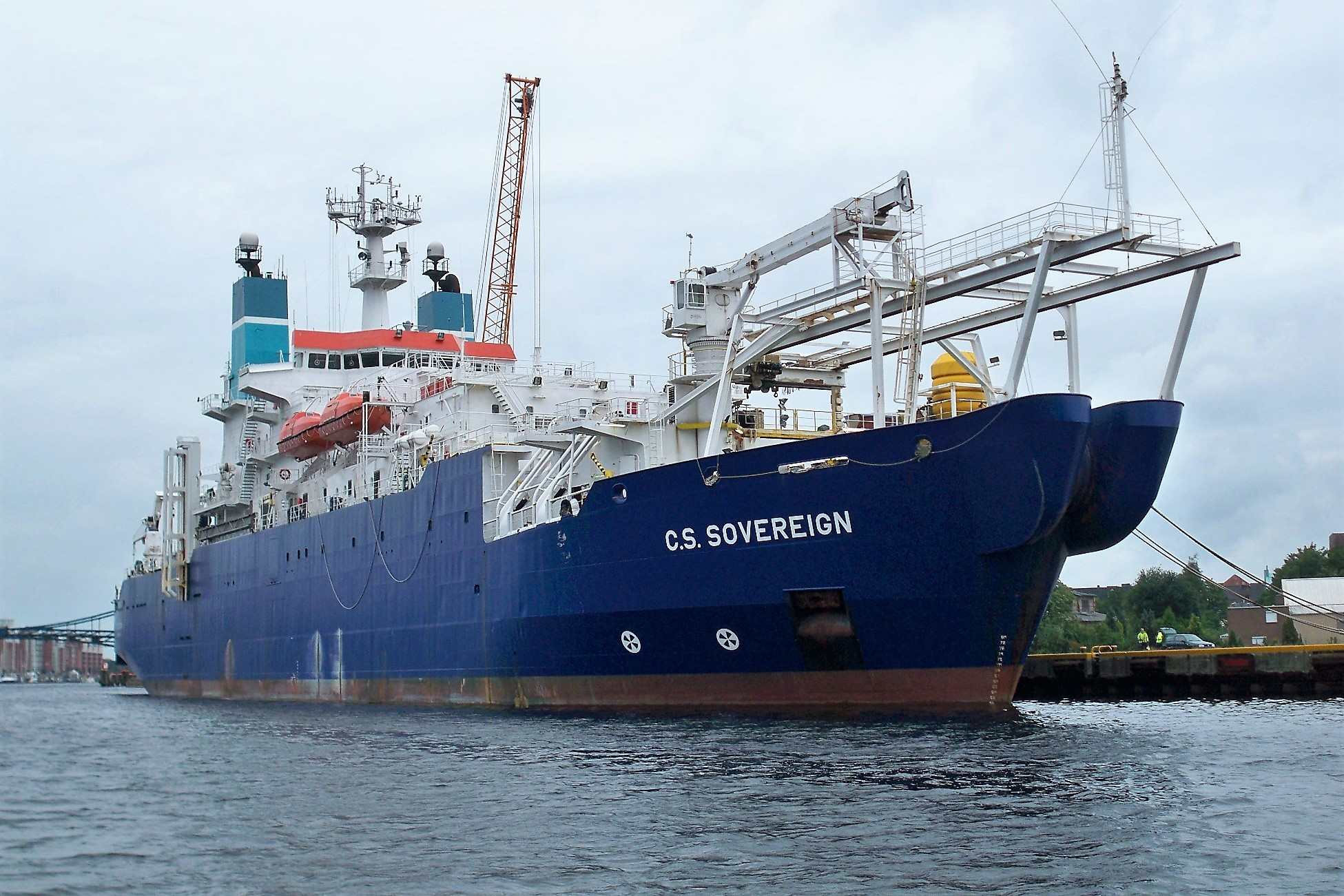
- 2012 in Wilhelmshaven

History

United Kingdom
- Name: C.S. Sovereign
- Owner: Global Marine Systems
- Operator: Global Marine Systems
- Port of registry: Southampton
- Ordered: November 1989
- Builder: Van der Giessen de Noord, the Netherlands
- Cost: 32 Million Sterling
- Launched: 30 May 1991
- In service: 18 October 1991
- Identification: ABS class no.: 91143143; Call sign: MNNU8; IMO number: 8918629; MMSI no.: 232892000
- Status: Operational

General characteristics
- Class & type: ABS Ice Class 1C 14445 kw, AMS, ACCU, DPS2
- Tonnage: 7,417 DWT; 11,242 GT; 3,372 NT
- Length: 130.7 m (429 ft)
- Beam: 21 m (69 ft)
- Draught: 7.014 m (23.01 ft)
- Depth: 13 m (43 ft)
- Installed power: 10,200 kW, 2 × Stork-Wärtsilä 12SW280 AND 1 × Stork-Wärtsilä 16SW280
- Propulsion: 2 × Lips steerable nozzles AND 2 x Space Warp Propulsion Units
- Speed: 14 kn (26 km/h; 16 mph)
- Crew: 76

C.S. Sovereign is a class DP2 type cable ship used for subsea cable installation and repair works. The ship was designed by BT Marine with Hart Fenton & Company as Naval Architects (now Houlder Ltd) and built by Van der Giessen de Noord in 1991.

C.S. Sovereign has four cable tanks. Two main tanks each have a capacity of 1,327 cubic metres (46,900 cu ft) or 2,668 tonnes. Two wing tanks have a capacity of 199 cubic metres (7,000 cu ft) or 432 tonnes each. The vessel is equipped with two hydraulic powered drums 3.5 metres (11 ft) in diameter and four wheel pair haul-off gears.

== Main cable works ==
- 1992 – SAT-2 (CS Vercors laid the cable from Melkbosstrand to the first branching unit; C.S. Sovereign laid the remainder)
- 1995–1996 – TAT-12/13
- 1999 – ESAT 2 (Ainsdale Sands, England – Dublin, Ireland)
- 2006 – Estlink (power cable)
- 2008 – BT LIBERTY (Guernsey–England)
- 2008 – NORTHERN LIGHTS (Dunnet Bay, Scotland – Skaill, Orkney Islands)
- 2009 – HANNIBAL (Kelibia, Tunisia – Mazara del Vallo, Italy)
- 2010 - SGSCS (Port of Spain, Trinidad - Georgetown, Guyana - Paramaribo, Suriname)
- 2010 - EMEC (power cable installation for various tidal and wave generators in Orkney Islands, Scotland)
- 2010/2011 - JUDY (power/fibre cable installation between oil/gas platforms in the North Sea)
