= Royal Sovereign =

Royal Sovereign can refer to:

- HMS Royal Sovereign, any of various ships of the Royal Navy
- Royal Sovereign-class battleship, a class of pre-dreadnought battleships of the Royal Navy
- Revenge-class battleship, a class of Royal Navy dreadnoughts sometimes referred to as the Royal Sovereign class
- Royal Sovereign (1829 ship), a merchant ship used to transport convicts to Australia
- Royal Sovereign, a GWR 3031 Class locomotive of the Great Western Railway, England
- The Royal Sovereign Lighthouse, Eastbourne, England
  - The Royal Sovereign shoal which the lighthouse marks
- Royal Sovereign International, Inc., an international supplier of appliances and office products, acquired by Dickinson Robinson Group

== See also ==
- Sovereign-class cruise ship, a cruise ship class of the Royal Caribbean line
- Sovereign (disambiguation)
