= HMS Sovereign =

HMS Sovereign may refer to the following English and Royal Navy warships:

- English ship Trinity Sovereign (1488), also known as Sovereign, an English warship built in 1488, rebuilt in 1510, and in service until 1521
- English ship Sovereign, launched as Sovereign of the Seas in 1637, she was renamed Sovereign in 1650 and Royal Sovereign in 1660. Remained in service until 1696
- HMS Sovereign (S108), a submarine in commission from 1974 to 2006
- HMS Royal Sovereign, seven ships of the Royal Navy have been named HMS Royal Sovereign
