= MS Sovereign =

Cruise ship (1987–2020)

- Sovereign in Barcelona, Spain on 1 April 2017

History
- Name: 1988-2008: Sovereign of the Seas; 2008-2020: Sovereign
- Owner: 1988-1997: Royal Caribbean Cruise Line; 1997-2020: Royal Caribbean Group
- Operator: 1988-2008: Royal Caribbean International; 2008-2020: Pullmantur Cruises
- Port of registry: 1987-2005: Oslo, Norway; 2005-2008: Nassau, Bahamas; 2008-2020: Valletta, Malta
- Builder: Chantiers de l'Atlantique; St. Nazaire, France
- Yard number: A29
- Laid down: June 10, 1986
- Launched: April 4, 1987
- Sponsored by: Rosalynn Carter
- Christened: January 15, 1988
- Completed: December 18, 1987
- Maiden voyage: January 16, 1988 as Sovereign of the Seas; March 23, 2009 as Sovereign
- In service: 1988–2020
- Out of service: 2020
- Identification: Call sign: 9HUE9; IMO number: 8512281; MMSI no.: 249539000
- Fate: Scrapped in Aliağa in 2020

General characteristics
- Class & type: Sovereign-class cruise ship
- Tonnage: 73,529 GT; 45,194 NT; 7,546.9 DWT; (Previously 73,192 GT and 7,283 DWT)
- Length: 268.32 m (880 ft 4 in)
- Beam: 32.2 m (105 ft 8 in)
- Draft: 7.8 m (25 ft 7 in)
- Installed power: Four 9-cylinder Pielstick-Alsthom diesel engines; 21,844 kW (combined)
- Propulsion: Two controllable pitch propellers; Two bow thrusters
- Speed: 21.5 knots (39.8 km/h; 24.7 mph)
- Capacity: 2,650 passengers

MS Sovereign (formerly Sovereign of the Seas) was one of three large cruise ships of the Sovereign class operated by Pullmantur Cruises and formerly by Royal Caribbean International. When she was completed in 1987, Sovereign of the Seas was the world's largest passenger ship. On 24 June 2020, due to economic losses caused by COVID-19 pandemic, Sovereign arrived and was beached at Aliağa, Turkey, where she was dismantled.

== History ==
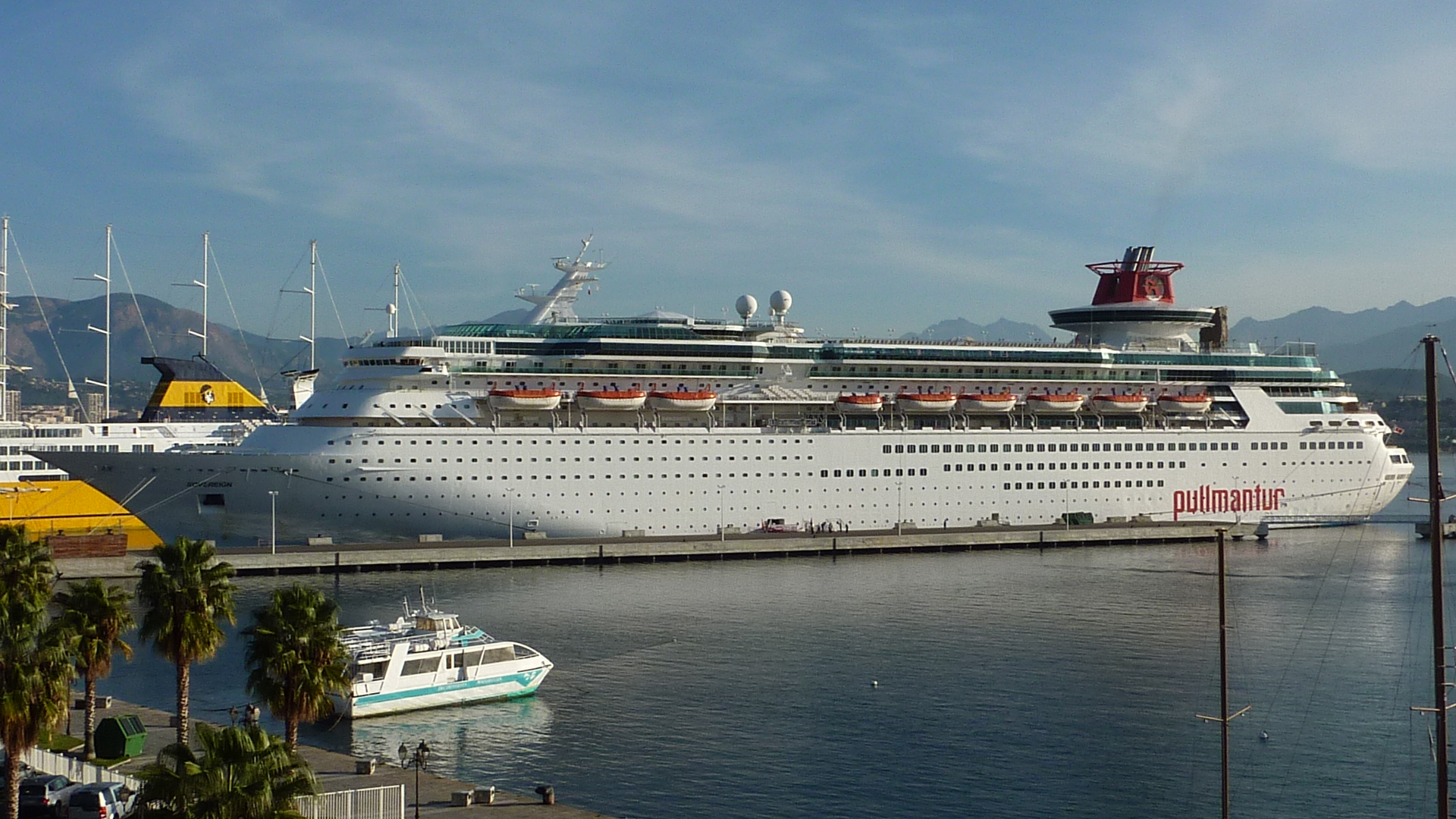
Sovereign docked at Ajaccio, Corsica in 2008 with her original Pullmantur livery

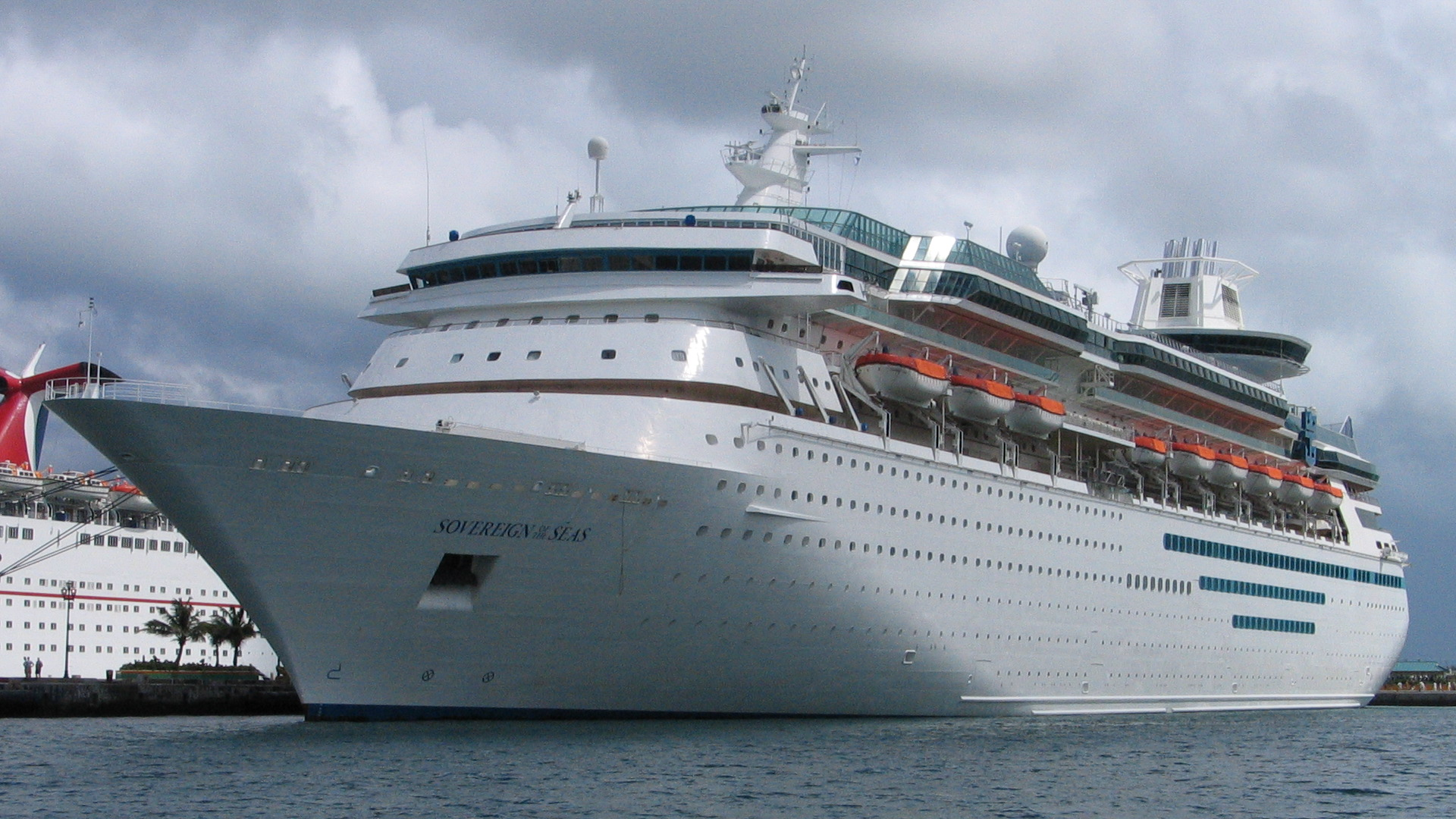
Sovereign of the Seas in Nassau, Bahamas, 2005

She sailed on her maiden voyage on January 16, 1988, and was initially based at the Port of Miami.

In 1998 and 1999, the Royal Caribbean International cruise company was fined US$9 million because Sovereign of the Seas had repeatedly dumped oily waste into the ocean and tried to hide this using false records, including fake piping diagrams given to the US Coast Guard. Because the company was and is incorporated in Liberia, Royal Caribbean argued that this case was not in the jurisdiction of US courts.

Her refurbishment in November 2004 was the subject of the Travel Channel mini-series Dry-Dock, A Cruise Ship Reborn. Throughout her time with Royal Caribbean she sailed cruises to the Bahamas and the Caribbean out of Miami and Port Canaveral, Florida. These cruises visited Coco Cay, one of RCI's privately owned islands, in the Berry Islands group.

In November 2008 Sovereign of the Seas was transferred to the fleet of Pullmantur Cruises, a Royal Caribbean Cruises Ltd subsidiary, and renamed MS Sovereign. Sovereign set sail on its first voyage with Pullmantur Cruises on March 23, 2009. Similar to other ships in the same class, Sovereign had a multi-deck atrium lobby and a top-deck, funnel-mounted lounge with panoramic views of the sea. The ship's facilities included nine bars, five restaurants, four pools, a spa and a casino.

In 2018, the ship was featured in the film Yucatán, filmed by Telecinco Cinema.

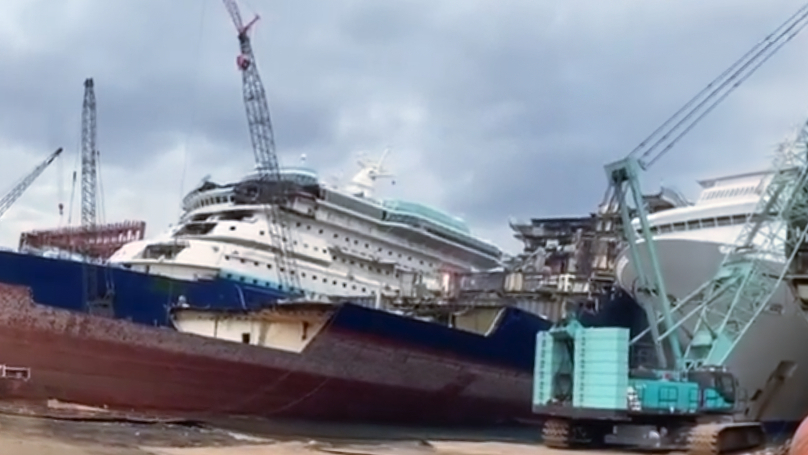
Sovereign being scrapped in Aliaga, Turkey in October 2020

In 2020, amid the COVID-19 pandemic, Sovereign and MS Monarch were placed into "cold lay-up" and Pullmantur Cruises filed for financial reorganization. According to reports, the interiors of the ships were stripped of "everything of value." On 23 July 2020 she was beached in Aliağa alongside her sistership Monarch, which was beached one day before. Scrapping began in August that year and was finished in February 2021.

== See also ==
- Yucatán, a 2018 Spanish comedy film set on MS Sovereign.
- Dil Dhadakne Do, a 2015 Indian family feature film was set on MS Sovereign.
