= Sovereign-class cruise ship =

Class of Royal Caribbean cruise ships

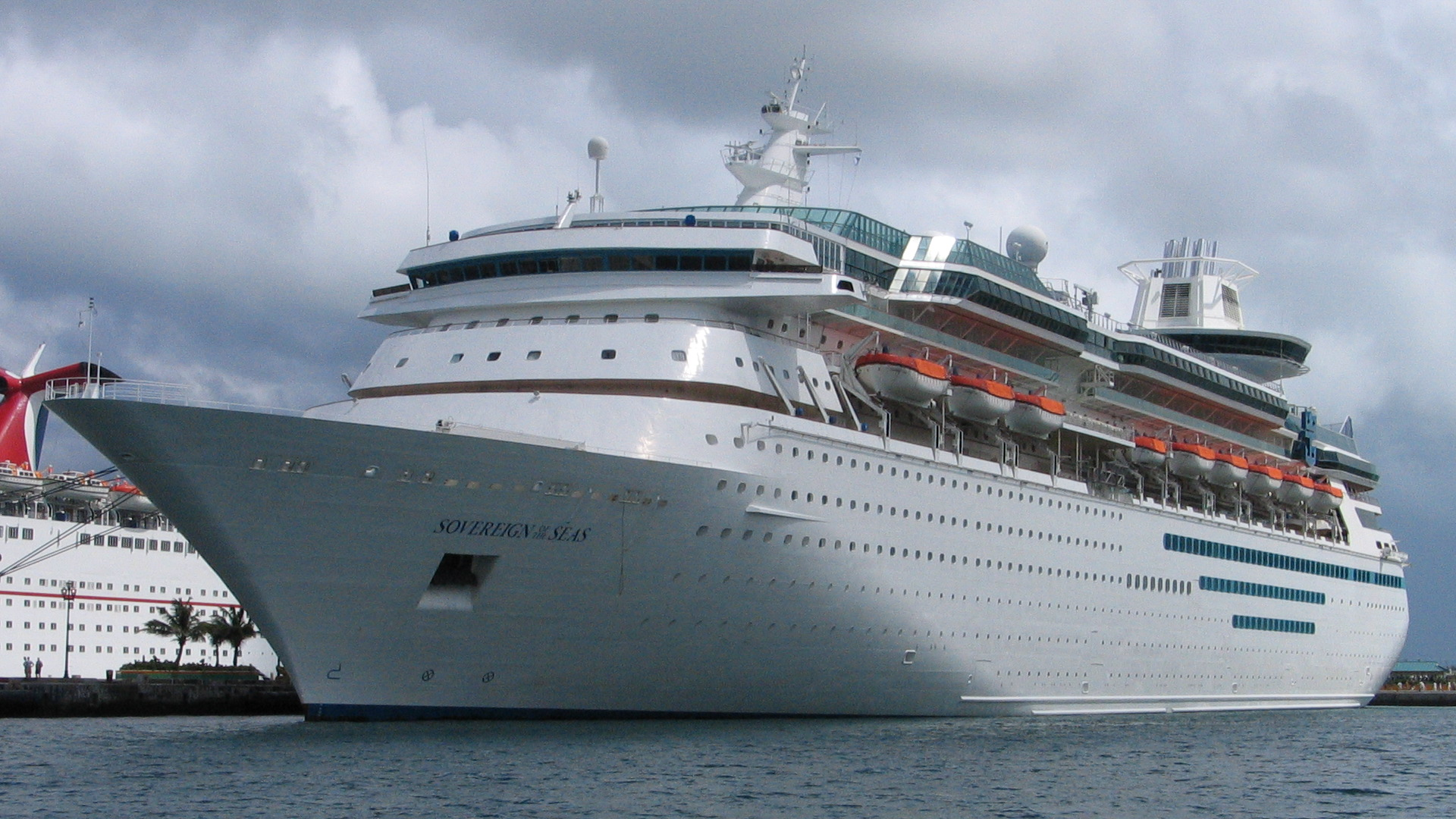
- MS Sovereign as Sovereign of the Seas

Class overview
- Builders: Chantiers de l’Atlantique; Saint-Nazaire, France
- Operators: Royal Caribbean International; Pullmantur Cruises; Seajets
- Preceded by: Song of America
- Succeeded by: Vision class
- Built: 1986–1992
- In service: 1987-2020
- Completed: 3
- Active: 0
- Laid up: 1
- Retired: 2

General characteristics
- Tonnage: 73,192–73,941 GT
- Length: 268.33 m (880 ft 4 in)
- Beam: 32.21 m (105 ft 8 in)
- Draft: 7.55 m (24 ft 9 in)
- Decks: 12
- Installed power: 4 × 9-cylinder Pielstick-Alsthom diesel engines combined in two pairs at 21,844 kW (29,293 hp) per pair for props; 2 × 9-cylinder Pielstick-Alsthom diesels powering separate generators totaling about 17,000 kW (23,000 hp)
- Propulsion: 2 controllable pitch propellers with two rudders rear and two through bow thrusters
- Speed: 21.5 knots (39.8 km/h; 24.7 mph)
- Capacity: 2,744 passengers
- Crew: 833

The Sovereign class is Royal Caribbean Cruises Ltd's third generation of cruise ship, formerly operated by Royal Caribbean International

The three ships of the class were built in Saint-Nazaire, France at the Chantiers de l'Atlantique shipyards. The first modern "megaships" to be built, they also were the first series of cruise ships to include a multi-story atrium with glass elevators, which the ship's designer, Njål Eide, referred to as the "Centrum". They also had a single deck devoted entirely to cabins with private balconies instead of oceanview cabins. The first ship, Sovereign of the Seas launched in 1988, was the world's largest passenger ship in service, breaking the record held by SS Norway (originally designed as an ocean liner). Sovereign held this distinction until 1990 when Norway took back the record after being refurbished with the addition of two more decks. In 1991, Royal Caribbean International launched a slightly modified sister ship, Monarch of the Seas. In 1992, the line launched its third and final sister ship, Majesty of the Seas. These ships were among the largest modern cruise ships to sail during the late 1980s and early 1990s.

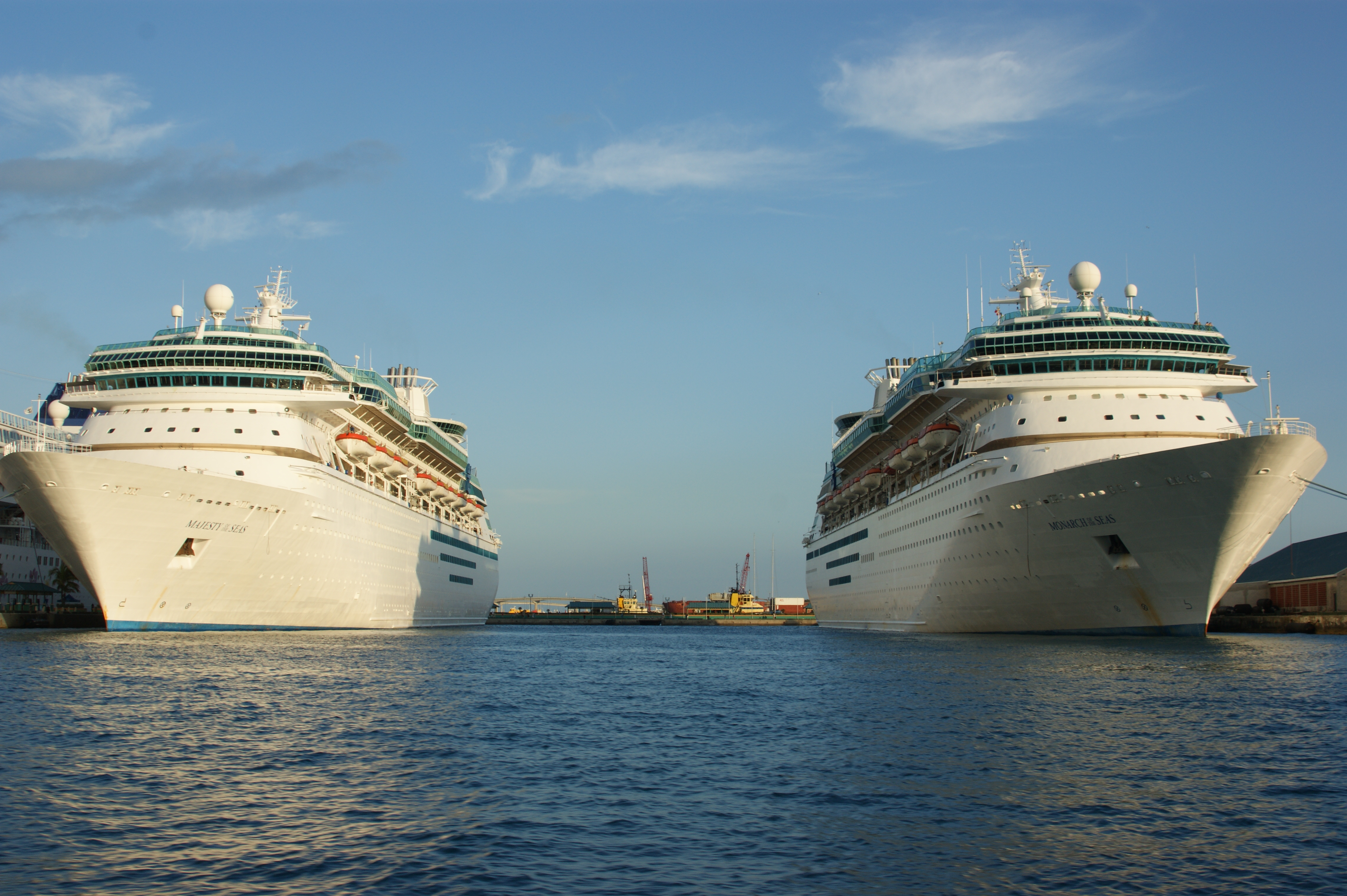
Majesty of the Seas and Monarch of the Seas In Nassau, Bahamas

During that time, other major cruise lines also followed suit, building ships that included many of the same features and similar dimensions as the Sovereign class. Carnival Cruise Lines launched the Fantasy class in 1990, comparable in size to the Sovereign class and also featuring a multi-story atrium with glass elevators. Princess Cruises also countered by launching two ships in 1990 and 1991 to compete with the Sovereign class, Crown Princess and Regal Princess. They also featured an atrium and two decks devoted to cabins with private balconies instead of windowed "oceanview" cabins. Since then, newer and larger ships have exceeded the size of the Sovereign-class ships. They are less than half the size of the Freedom-class ships and about a third the size of Oasis-class ships.

In 2007, Monarch of the Seas became the first major cruise liner in the world to be captained by a woman, the Swede Karin Stahre Janson, who remained the only one until 2010 when the British captain Sarah Breton took charge of MS Artemis of P&O Cruises.

Royal Caribbean Cruises Ltd transferred Sovereign of the Seas and Monarch of the Seas from Royal Caribbean International to their Pullmantur Cruises subsidiary in 2008 and 2013, respectively. Plans to transfer Majesty of the Seas to Pullmantur in 2016 had been announced in November 2014. However, in July 2015, Royal Caribbean reversed those plans, instead stating that Majesty of the Seas would stay with Royal Caribbean International and be receiving a massive overhaul and upgrade in early 2016 to bring her up to today's standards.

As of July 2020, the first two ships, Sovereign and Monarch, have been sold for scrap, due to the bankruptcy of Pullmantur Cruises. In December 2020, Royal Caribbean sold the remaining ship Majesty of the Seas to Seajets who renamed her Majesty. Seajets renamed the ship Majesty of the Oceans in April 2021, while still laid up at Piraeus.

== Ships ==
Ship	Operated By	Year Built	Gross tonnage	Notes	Image
Sovereign	Pullmantur Cruises	1987	73,192	Largest passenger ship in the world at the time of its completion. Completely refurbished in November 2004. Transferred to Pullmantur and renamed Sovereign in 2008. Scrapped in Aliağa in 2020.	
Monarch	Pullmantur Cruises	1991	73,937	Completely refurbished in May 2003. Transferred to Pullmantur and renamed Monarch in 2013. Scrapped in Aliağa in 2020.	
Majesty	Seajets	1992	73,941	Built as Majesty of the Seas for Royal Caribbean International. Sold in 2020.	
