= Sovereign (1789 ship) =

History

Great Britain
- Name: Sovereign
- Builder: Edward Mosley, Howdon
- Launched: 1789
- Fate: Wrecked 22 January 1804

General characteristics
- Tons burthen: 382, or 395, or 430 (bm)
- Complement: 49
- Armament: 1803:8 × 4&12-pounder guns; 1804:10 guns + 2 × 12-pounder carronades

Sovereign was launched at Newcastle in 1789. She traded between London and South Carolina and then as a transport. In 1802 she became a Guineaman, i.e., a slave ship, in the triangular trade in enslaved people. She wrecked on 22 January 1804, as she was returning from the West Indies where she had landed her captives at Trinidad.

== Career ==
Sovereign first appeared in Lloyd's Register (LR) in 1789.

Year	Master	Owner	Trade	Source
1789	J.Benn	Brown	London–South Carolina	LR

On 19 November 1791 as Sovereign was returning to London, she came across a brig on her side at 49°10′N 8°30′W. The brig had been abandoned and a strong wind was causing the seas to break over her. Sovereign arrived in the Downs on 26 November.

Lloyd's List reported on 14 November 1794, that Sovereign, Benn, master, was one of seven transports that had sailed to Toulon from Corsica as cartels, carrying prisoners. The transports were presumably carrying prisoners from the British capture of Corsica. When the vessels arrived at Toulon, the French detained them.

Year	Master	Owner	Trade	Source
1795	J.Benn	Brown	London–South Carolina	LR
1800	Balmano	Brown & Co.	London transport	LR
1802	Balmano; J.Ward	Brown & Co.	London transport London–Africa	LR

Voyage transporting enslaved people (1802–Loss): Captain John Ward sailed from London on 7 November 1802. In 1802, 155 vessels sailed from English ports to Africa to acquire and transport enslaved people; 15 of these vessels sailed from London.

Sovereign acquired captives at Bonny. Ward was issued a letter of marque on 2 July 1803, but by that time he was dead. Lloyd's List (LL) reported on 3 September 1803, that Sovereign, late Ward, had arrived at Suriname from Africa and was bound for Trinidad. Ward had died while Sovereign was in Africa. She arrived at Trinidad on 22 July 1803 with 319 captives.

== Fate ==
On 22 January 1804, Sovereign, B.Richardson, master, struck the Smith's Rocks, a submerged reef in the Irish Sea off Ballycotton, County Cork. She was about a mile from shore as she was coming from Trinidad and Tortola to London. She foundered within 10 minutes of striking the rock with most on board drowning. Casualty counts differed by report. One stated that eight of 37 people on board were saved. Another stated that 31 of the 40 people on board were lost. A third stated nine out of 35 were saved. Four of the people on board were passengers, three or four of whom were saved. She was carrying sugar, coffee, indigo, hides, and elephants' teeth (ivory).

By one account, five local men, led by a Dennis Flinn, took a boat out. Because of the weather, it took them several hours to reach the wreck even though it was not far away. When they reached the wreck they were able to rescue five men who had taken to one of her masts. Shortly thereafter, the mast fell overboard. When the weather abated, people on shore launched boats to retrieve whatever flotsam they could, to secret it.

In 1804, some 30 British vessels in the triangular trade were lost. At least one of these was lost on the homeward leg of her voyage. During the period 1793 to 1807, war, rather than maritime hazards or resistance by the captives, was the greatest cause of vessel losses among British enslaving vessels.
