= ConQuesT =

Annual science fiction convention held in the Kansas City, Missouri area

- Status: Active
- Genre: Science fiction, fantasy, and horror
- Venue: Sheraton Kansas City Hotel at Crown Center
- Location: Kansas City, Missouri
- Country: United States
- Attendance: 518 (for ConQuesT 50)
- Organizer: The Kansas City Science Fiction and Fantasy Society
- Website: http://www.conquestkc.org/

ConQuesT was the annual science fiction and fantasy convention held in the Kansas City, Missouri area over Memorial Day weekend. It was sponsored by the long-running (since 1971) Kansas City Science Fiction and Fantasy Society (KaCSFFS, pronounced kax-fuss). ConQuesT was the oldest such fan convention of its type in Missouri and in the U. S. central states region. It was first established using the name Mid-America Con in June 1972. After that, the next nine KaCSFFS-sponsored conventions were named BYOB-Cons (the final "B" in the name having additional and alternate science fictional meanings beyond the traditional meanings.) In 1980 KaCSFFS adopted the permanent name ConQuesT (sometimes abbreviated CQT) for the convention.

The convention's purpose was to celebrate science fiction, fantasy, and horror "in all its various forms", but with a nod toward the literary side of these closely related genres. For some years its programming had been built around a different yearly theme.

== Conventions ==
=== 1970s ===
- Mid-America Con – Held June, 16-18, 1972 at the downtown Hotel Continental, and featured author guests of honor Philip José Farmer and James E. Gunn, fan guests Vern and Rita Coriell, special guest Russ Myers, and toastmasters Ken Keller and Jim Loehr.
- BYOB-Con 1 (relaxicon) – Held on a weekend in late fall 1972 at the Glenwood Manor Motor Hotel (no guests of honor). It used a well-stocked convention suite with an attached room used for minimal item programming, including a few genre films shown in 16 mm.
- BYOB-Con 2 (relaxicon) – Held spring 1973 at the Glenwood Manor Motor Hotel (no guests of honor). See previous entry for matching details.
- BYOB-Con 3 (relaxicon/3 day long fan party with filk singing, partying, games, discussions, fanzines, more partying, and a BBQ cookout with all the trimmings) – Held in fall of 1973 at a private residence in Independence, MO (no guests of honor).
- BYOB-Con 4 - Held summer 1974 at the Muehlebach Hotel, and featured author guest of honor Wilson Tucker, fan guest Hoy Ping Pong, and toastmaster Bob Tucker.
- BYOB-Con 5 – Held summer 1975 at the Radisson Muehlebach Hotel, and featured author guest of honor Robert Bloch, fan guests Ron & Linda Bushyager, special guests Harlan Ellison, Tim Kirk, and toastmaster Bob Tucker.
- BYOB-Con 6 – Held 1976 at the Airport Marriott Hotel, and featured author guest of honor C. L. Moore, fan guest Fred Haskell, and toastmaster Jodi Offut.
- BYOB-Con 7 – Held 1977 at the Hotel President, and featured author guest of honor C. J. Cherryh, fan guests Bill & Sherry Fesselmeyer, and toastmaster Wilson (Bob) Tucker.
- BYOB-Con 8 – Held 1978 at the Hotel President, and featured author guest of honor Marion Zimmer Bradley, fan guest Jan Howard Finder, and toastmaster Allan J. Wilde.
- BYOB-Con 9 – Held 1979 at the Grandview Hotel, and featured author guest of honor Karl Edward Wagner, fan guest Martha Beck, special guest author Carl Sherrell, and toastmaster Andrew J. Offutt.

=== 1980s ===
- ConQuesT 1980 – Held 1980 at the Hotel President in downtown Kansas City, MO, and featured author guest of honor Gordon R. Dickson, fan guest Garth Danielson, and toastmaster John Kessel.
- ConQuesT 2 – Held 1981 at the downtown Hotel Continental, and featured author guest of honor Poul Anderson, fan guest of honor Donald C. Thompson, and toastmaster Lee Killough.
- ConQuesT 3 – Held 1982 at the downtown Roadway Inn, and featured author guest of honor Norman Spinrad, fan guest of honor Nancy Nutt, and toastmaster Warren Norwood.
- ConQuesT 4 + 10 (including 1970s cons) – Held 1983 at the downtown Howard Johnson's Central, and featured author guest of honor Kate Wilhelm, fan guest Ken Moore, and toastmaster John Kessel.
- ConQuesT 15 – Held 1984 at the downtown Howard Johnson's Central, and featured author guest of honor Frederik Pohl, fan guest Susan Satterfield, and toastmaster Thomas M. Disch.
- ConQuesT 16 – Held 1985 at the downtown Howard Johnson's Central, and featured author guest of honor George R. R. Martin, artist guest of honor Dell Harris, fan guests Robert "Buck" Coulson and Juanita Coulson, and toastmaster Algis Budrys.
- ConQuesT 17 – Held 1986 at the downtown Howard Johnson's Central, and featured author guest of honor Tim Powers, fan guest Ann Layman Chancellor, and toastmaster Edward Bryant.
- ConQuesT 18 – Held 1987 at the downtown Howard Johnson's Central, and featured author guest of honor John Varley, artist guest of honor Don Maitz, fan guest Brian Thomsen, and toastmaster Rusty Hevelin.
- ConQuesT 19 – Held 1988 at the downtown Howard Johnson's Central, and featured author guest of honor Howard Waldrop, artist guest of honor Carl Lundgren, fan guest Bob Hise, and toastmaster David G. Hartwell.
- ConQuesT 20 – Held 1989 at the downtown Howard Johnson's Central, and featured author guest of honor Elizabeth Scarborough, artist guest Angela Lowry, fan guest Rebekah Rogge, and toastmaster C. J. Cherryh.

=== 1990s ===
- ConQuesT 21 – Held 1990 at the downtown Howard Johnson's Central, and featured author guest of honor Melinda M. Snodgrass, fan guest David Means, artist guest Darrell K. Sweet, and toastmaster Bradley Denton.
- ConQuesT 22 – Held 1991, and featured author guest of honor John Kessel, fan guest Laura LeHew, artist guest Dan Patterson, and toastmaster Mike McQuay.
- ConQuesT 23 – Held May 22–24, 1992 and featured author guest of honor Michael Kube-McDowell, fan guest "Uncle Timmy" Bolgeo, artist guest Bob Eggleton, and toastmaster Vic Milan.
- ConQuesT 24 – Held May 28–30, 1993 and featured author guest of honor James P. Hogan, fan guest Parris (later Parris McBride), artist guest Nick Smith, and toastmaster Steven Gould.
- ConQuesT 25 – Held May 27–30, 1994 at the Park Place Hotel and featured author guest of honor Steven Brust, fan guest Leonard Bishop, artist guest David Cherry, and toastmaster Pat Cadigan.
- ConQuesT 26 – Held May 26–28, 1995 at the Park Place Hotel, featured author guest of honor Octavia Butler, fan guest Cheryl Medley, artist guest David Lee Anderson, special guest Mike Glyer, and toastmaster Mike Resnick.
- ConQuesT 27 – Held May 24–26, 1996 at the Park Place Hotel, and featured guest of honor Allen Steele, fan guest Myrna Logan, artist guest Lubov, special guest Wilson "Bob" Tucker, and toastmaster Lee Killough.
- ConQuesT 28 – Held May 23–25, 1997, at the Park Place Hotel, and featured guest of honor Larry Niven, fan guest Bob Stoltman, artist guest Alan M. Clark, and toastmaster Wm. Mark Simmons.
- ConQuesT 29 – Held May 22–24, 1998, at the Park Place Hotel, and featured guest of honor K. W. Jeter, fan guest Gerald Burton, artist guest Keith Berdak, and toastmaster Vic Milan.
- ConQuesT 30 – Held May 28–30, 1999, at the Park Place Hotel, and featured guest of honor David Drake, artist guest Robert "J.R." Daniels, fan guest Samantha "Star" Straf, special guest Wilson "Bob" Tucker, and toastmaster Esther Friesner.

=== 2000s ===
- ConQuesT 31 – Held May 26–28, 2000 at the Park Place Hotel, and featured guest of honor Walter Jon Williams, fan guests Dick Smith and Leah Zeldes Smith, artist guest Brad W. Foster, and toastmaster Darrell K. Sweet. Convention theme: "It's the end of the world as we know it!"
- ConQuesT 32 – Held May 25–27, 2001, at the Park Place, and featured guest of honor James K. Morrow, fan guest Roger Tener, artist guest Bill Hodgson, and toastmaster Stephen Pagel.
- ConQuesT 33 – Held May 24–26, 2002, at the Kansas City Airport Hilton, featured guest of honor Connie Willis, fan guest of honor Michael J. Walsh, artist guest Frank Kelly Freas, toastmaster Patrick Nielsen Hayden. Theme was "33 1/3"
- ConQuesT 34 – Held May 23–25, 2003 at the Kansas City Airport Hilton, and featured guest of honor Elizabeth Moon, fan guest Suzanne Carnival-Reece, artist guest of honor Vincent Di Fate, special guest John Ringo, and toastmaster Ellen Datlow.
- ConQuesT 35 – Held May 28–30, 2004 at the Kansas City Airport Hilton, and featured author guest of honor Jennifer Roberson and artist guest of honor Jody A. Lee.
- ConQuesT 36 – Held May 27–29, 2005 at the Kansas City Airport Hilton, and featured author guest of honor Joe Haldeman, fan guests Les and Jeanette Roth, artist guest Theresa Mather, and toastmaster George R. R. Martin.
- ConQuesT 37 – Held May 26–28, 2006 at the Kansas City Airport Hilton, and featured author guest of honor Kage Baker, fan guest Charles Piehl, and artist guest Mitch Bentley, and toastmaster Howard Waldrop.
- ConQuesT 38 – Held May 25–27, 2007 at the Kansas City Airport Hilton, and featured author guest of honor Phyllis Eisenstein, fan guest Deb Geisler, artist guest Teddy Harvia, and toastmistress Teresa Nielsen Hayden. Also in attendance: Howard Waldrop.
- ConQuesT 39 – Held May 23–25, 2008 at the Kansas City Airport Hilton, and featured author guest of honor Joe R. Lansdale, fan guests Chris and Laurie Felknor, media guests Jeff East and Ellen Muth, artist guest David Lee Anderson, and toastmaster William Mark Simmons.
- ConQuesT 40 – Held May 22–24, 2009 at the Hyatt Regency Crown Center, and featured author guest of honor John Scalzi, fan guest Ed DeGruy, media guest Jerry Gelb, artist guest Oberon Zell, toastmaster Ellen Datlow.

=== 2010s ===
- ConQuesT 41 – Held May 28–30, 2010 at the Hyatt Regency Crown Center, and featured author guest of honor Michael Swanwick, fan guest Geri Sullivan, artist guest Peri Charlifu, special guest Pete Abrams, and toastmaster Toni Weisskopf. The theme for the weekend was "Steampunk and Evil Geniuses".
- ConQuesT 42 – Held May 27–29, 2011 at the Hyatt Regency Crown Center, and featured author guest of honor Tamora Pierce, fan guest Tadao Tomomatsu, artist guest Erin McKee, media guest The Great Luke Ski, and toastmaster Rachel Caine. The theme for the weekend was "Life, the Universe, and ... you know the drill ... bring your own towel!"
- ConQuesT 43 – Held May 25–27, 2012, at the Sheraton Kansas City Hotel at Crown Center, and featured author guests of honor Sharon Lee and Steve Miller, fan guest Tim Miller (of FenCon), artist guest Ursula Vernon, editor guest Gardner Dozois, and toastmaster Susan Satterfield. The theme for the weekend was "Into the Unknown".
- ConQuesT 44 – Held May 24–26, 2013, at the Holiday Inn CoCo Key Water Resort (eastern Kansas City, Missouri), and featured guests of honor Patrick Rothfuss, fan guest Christopher Garcia, artist guest John Picacio, editor guest Teresa Nielsen Hayden, comics guest John Kovalic, and toastmaster Patricia C. Wrede. Other program participants included fantasy authors George R. R. Martin and Bradley Denton. The theme for the convention weekend was "Magic, Mystery & Mayhem".
- ConQuesT 45 – Held May 23–25, 2014, at the Kansas City Marriott Downtown, and featured guests of honor Glen Cook, fan guests Barb and Ray VanTillburg, artist guest David Lee Pancake, science guest Bridget Landry of JPL, and toastmaster Caroline Spector. The theme was "Fantasy and Science Fiction Noir".
- ConQuesT 46 – Held May 22–24, 2015, at the Kansas City Marriott Downtown, and featured guests of honor Brandon Sanderson, fan guest Mark Oshiro, artist guest Nene Thomas, editor guest George R. R. Martin, and toastmaster Selina Rosen. The convention's theme was "The Adventure Begins HERE!", an homage to role play gaming.
- ConQuesT 47 – Held May 27–29, 2016, at the Sheraton Kansas City Hotel at Crown Center, and featured guests of honor Nnedi Okorafor, fan guest Diane Lacey, artist guest Julie Dillon, and "toast" (toastmaster) Seanan McGuire. The convention's theme was "Prime".
- ConQuesT 48 – Held May 26–28, 2017, at the Sheraton Kansas City Hotel at Crown Center, and featured guests of honor Robert J. Sawyer, fan guest Zac Zacarola, artist guest Rachel Mayo, and toastmaster Jonathan Maberry. No convention theme was adopted.
- ConQuesT 49 – Held May 25–27, 2018, at the Sheraton Kansas City Hotel at Crown Center, and featured writer guest of honor Steven Barnes, fan guest Aurora Celeste, artist guest Elizabeth Leggett, toastmaster Scott Washington, and special guest Matt Jacobson. The convention theme was "Exploring Unexpected Worlds".
- ConQuesT 50 – Held May 24–26, 2019 at the Sheraton Kansas City Hotel at Crown Center, and featured writer guest of honor Timothy Zahn, artist guest of honor Charles Urbach, and fan guests of honor Jennifer and James Liang. The convention's theme was "Mad Science and Experimental Wizardry".

=== 2020s ===
- ConQuesT 51 – Canceled due to the world-wide Covid-19 pandemic. The convention was to have been held on its usual Memorial Day holiday weekend, 2020, at the Sheraton Kansas City Hotel at Crown Center. The Writer Guest of Honor was to have been Mary Robinette Kowal, the Artist Guest of Honor was to have been Toni L. Taylor, and the Fan Guest of Honor was to have been Jim Young. No convention theme had been announced at the time the convention was canceled on March 29, 2020.
- ConQuesT 52 – Due to the on-going world-wide Covid-19 pandemic, the convention was held virtually on-line at the ConQuesT website and the Discord platform during the three day Memorial Day weekend, May 28–30, 2021. Becky Chambers was the Writer Guest of Honor. Dan Wells was also the Writer Guest of Honor. Toni L. Taylor was the Artist Guest of Honor. The convention theme was "The Future Is Now (and Then)".
- ConQuesT 53 – Held May 27–29, 2022 at the Sheraton Kansas City Hotel at Crown Center, and featured writer guest of honor Fonda Lee, artist guest of honor Donato Giancola, and fan guests of honor Ken Keller (founder of ConQuesT & KaCSFFS) and Jim Young. Theodore Sturgeon Memorial Award winner Jessica Campbell was also a special guest of honor. No convention theme was announced, but it was ConQuesT's 50th anniversary (1972-2022).
- ConQuesT 54 - Held June 4-6, 2023 at the Kansas City Airport Hilton, and featured author guests of honor Mary Robinette Kowal and Janci Patterson, artist guest of honor Sara Felix, and fan guests of honor Pros and Cons Cosplay.

=== Forthcoming? ===
ConQuesT has been on hiatus pending the location of a suitable venue for it to continue.
