= Game Face (disambiguation) =

Game Face is a 2001 album by Master P.

Game Face or Gameface may also refer to:

- Game Face (film), a 2015 sports documentary
- "Game Face" (Matlock), a television episode
- "Game Face" (The Shield), a television episode
- GameFace, a British sitcom
- Gameface, a 2003 album by Jay R
- "Game Face", a song by Gov't Mule from Dose, 1998
- Game Face, the original name of Nickelodeon's Unfiltered

== See also ==
- GameFace Labs, an American technology development company
