= Chattacon =

Annual science fiction convention in Tennessee, US

- Status: Active
- Genre: Science fiction
- Venue: DoubleTree by Hilton
- Locations: Chattanooga, Tennessee
- Country: United States
- Inaugurated: 1976
- Attendance: 1,200+ (2014)
- Organizer: Chattanooga Speculative Fiction Fans, Inc.
- Filing status: 501(c)(3)
- Website: http://www.chattacon.org/

Chattacon was an annual science fiction convention held in Chattanooga, Tennessee. The convention is organized by the nonprofit Chattanooga Speculative Fiction Fans, Inc. First held in 1976, the convention drew more than 1,200 attendees to the Chattanooga Choo Choo Hotel in 2014.

Chattacon was founded by Chattanooga native Irv Koch; the first Chattacon was held in January 1976. Formatted as a "relaxacon", it drew 81 guests, and lost money. By Chattacon III in 1978, it was a more traditional science fiction convention, with A. E. van Vogt as Guest of Honor, and had returned the costs of its original organization to Koch, with enough left over to serve as seed money for Chattacon IV.

In August of 2025, it was announced that there would be no further Chattacons, due to the unavailability of any suitable venues in the area.

== Conventions ==
=== History ===
Chattacon 36, held January 21–23, 2011, included guests of honor writers Kristine Kathryn Rusch and Chelsea Quinn Yarbro, artist Ruth Thompson, filkers Bill and Brenda Sutton, and Baen Books publisher Toni Weisskopf as toastmaster. Attendance for this event was estimated at over 1,000 members.

Chattacon 37, held January 20–22, 2012, included writers Steve Miller and Sharon Lee, author Laura Ann Gilman, and artist John Picacio, plus The Morganville Vampires writer Rachel Caine as Special Guest and author Mark L. Van Name as Toastmaster.

Chattacon 38, held January 25–27, 2013, included guests of honor Tim Powers and Cherie Priest, artist guest William Stout, and toastmistress Wendy Webb.

Chattacon 39, held January 24–26, 2014, included guest of honor Tobias Buckell, featured guests John Kaufmann, Jean Johnson, and Robert Buettner, plus toastmistress Wendy Webb and special music guest Matthew Ebel.

Chattacon 40, held January 30–February 1, 2015, included guests of honor Julie Czerneda, Kathleen Ann Goonan, and Tobias Buckell, artist guests Alan M. Clark and David Deitrick, special guest Adam-Troy Castro, and toastmistress Wendy Webb.

Chattacon 41, held January 29–31, 2016 at the Chattanooga Choo Choo, included guest of honor William C. Dietz, artist guest of honor Scott Grimando, special guest Larry Correia and toastmistress Wendy Webb.

Chattacon 42, held January 20–22, 2017 at the Chattanooga Choo Choo, included guest of honor Mike Resnick, with Alan Pollack as the artist guest of honor, special guest Jennifer Mulvihill and toastmistress Wendy Webb.

Chattacon 43, held January 19-21, 2018 at the Chattanoogan, included guest of honor Peter David and artist guest of honor Todd McCaffrey, as well as artist Sam Flegal and gaming aficionado Michael Bielaczyc.

Chattacon 44, held January 19-21, 2019 at the Read House, included guest of honor Timothy Zahn and artist guest of honor Charles Urbach, as well as author Tim Waggoner and toastmaster D. Alan Lewis.

Chattacon 45, held January 26-28 2020 at the DoubleTree Hilton Chattanooga, included guest of honor Robert McCammon, artist guest of honor Melissa Gay, special guest Faith Hunter and toastmaster Big Daddy Voodoo.

Chattacon 46, was held January 22-24 2021, originally scheduled for the DoubleTree Hilton Chattanooga, was held live online on Discord. Guests included guest of honor M. D. Cooper, artist guest of honor Amanda Makepeace, special guest Brian Cooksey and toastmistress Brandy Bolgeo Hendren.

Chattacon 47, was held January 14-16 2022 at the DoubleTree Hilton Chattanooga. Guests included author guest of honor M.D. Cooper, artist guest of honor Amanda Makepeace, special guest Brian Cooksey, and toastmistress Brandy Bolgeo Hendren.

Chattacon 48, was held in January 2023 in Chattanooga. Guests include will include guest of honor Martin Powell, artist guest of honor Leia Powell, special guest B.L. Blankenship, special guest Paige Gardner (originally scheduled to attend Chattacon 47) and toastmaster Michael Corrie.
