= DemiCon =

Fan convention in Iowa, U.S.

- Status: Active
- Genre: Multi-genre
- Venue: Holiday Inn Northwest, 4800 Merle Hay Road, Des Moines, Iowa 50322
- Locations: Des Moines, Iowa
- Coordinates: 41.6489°N 93.6999°W
- Country: United States
- Inaugurated: 1990
- Organizer: Des Moines Science Fiction and Fantasy Society, Inc.
- Filing status: 501(c)(3), Nonprofit
- Website: demicon.org

DemiCon is an annual volunteer-run science fiction, fantasy, and gaming convention held in Des Moines, Iowa, in late April/early May. The convention was first held in 1990.

DemiCon's host organization is the Des Moines Science Fiction and Fantasy Society, Inc. (DMSFFS), a nonprofit group that promotes literacy, science, and the arts, especially through the enjoyment of science fiction and fantasy.

== Inception ==
DemiCon was founded in 1990 by fans who learned the trade from the likes of Joe Haldeman and graduates of his University of Iowa Writers' Workshop. These fans had formed the Des Moines Science Fiction Society in 1989, and at their first meeting, included a convention among their goals.

The event's name, DemiCon, is derived from the words "Des Moines Convention".

== Programming and Activities ==
DemiCon's decades of growth have led to a wide variety of programming, but some of the offerings remain consistent from year to year. The following programming is standard fare at each DemiCon:

- Opening Ceremonies, including a performance by Trans-Iowa Canal Company
- Gaming
- Masquerade and Cosplay (a structured and staged costume contest)
- Hall Costume contests (informal, no staging)
- Art show
- Dealers' room
- Panels with the guests of honor
- Presentations by musical guests and professional guests
- Consuite
- Room parties
- Closing Ceremonies

In addition to the staples listed above, DemiCon offers parallel-programming (also known as multiple-track sessions) that can include many diverse topics from Anime to Zombies. DemiCon is a family-friendly event, and offers a wide range of activities with appeal across generations of sci-fi and fantasy fans. A DemiCon member (attendee) might experience:

- Music room featuring filking
- Gaming competitions with prizes (from board games to electronic games)
- Live Action Role Playing (LARP)
- Fhannish Film Festival
- Venue D (open-mike entertainment)
- Discussions of literature, television, movies, media
- Panels on science, technology, and the future
- Steampunk and alternate history activities
- Anime programming and cosplay
- Children's programming
- Teen Lounge
- Presentations pertaining to a wide variety of hobbies and activities, such as:
  - needlework show-and-tell
  - home-brew tasting and judging
  - belly dancing
  - defending the world against zombies
- Demonstrations of costume and prop construction
- Iowa's Writers Forum
- Live theatrical performances, such as "TICC After Dark"
- Video room
- Blood drive
- Scavenger hunt

== Venues ==
DemiCon has always made its home in the metro area of Des Moines, Iowa, US.

DemiCon 1 through DemiCon 7 in 1990 to 1996 were held at the Howard Johnson (which is now the Holiday Inn Northwest) on Merle Hay Road. This was also the venue for DemiCon 9 in 1998.

The Inn at University was the venue for DemiCon 8 and 10 in 1997 and 1999.

For DemiCon 11 in 2000 through DemiCon 13 in 2002, the location was the University Park Holiday Inn in West Des Moines (which is now Sheraton).

The Hotel Fort Des Moines in the downtown area was the site of DemiCon 14 through 20 in 2003 through 2009.

In 2010, DemiCon 21 returned to its original location at the Holiday Inn Northwest. This is slated to be the convention's site through DemiCon 35 in 2024.

== Guests of Honor and Themes ==
The following table lists the annual themes, and the guests that have honored DemiCon since the event was founded.

Year	No.	Theme	Author Guest of Honor	Artist Guest of Honor	Fan Guest of Honor	Music Guest of Honor	Toastmaster
2023	34	Starbase DemiCon: A New World	Rachel Aukes	Carter Allen	(none)	Cheshire Moon	Mitch Thompson
2022	33	The After	Cory Doctorow	Andy Brase	John Johnson		Tadao Tomomatsu
2021	32	Super Manga Graphic Novels Comics Animation	Lettie Prell	Alison Johnstun; David Pancake	Orlando Winters; Dana Hinterleitner and Bruce Hinterleitner		Susan Leabhart; Mitch Thompson
2020	31	Legion of DemiCon	Lettie Prell	David Pancake	Dana Hinterleitner and Bruce Hinterleitner		Mitch Thompson
2019	30	It's About Time	Gail Carriger -- with Timeless GOHs Gay & Joe Haldeman	John Picacio	Becky Kinnamon & David Winterton		Susan Leabhart
2018	29	Down the Rabbit Hole	Christina Henry	Christine Mitzuk	Susan Leabhart		Mitch Thompson
2017	28	Heroes Shall Rise	Lars Pearson	Ron Wagner	Richard Harper		Susan Leabhart
2016	27	Zombies Always Ring Twice	Adam J. Whitlatch	Alan M. Clark	Gary and Erin Wickering		Tadao Tomomatsu
2015	26	The Magical World of DemiCon	Jim C. Hines	Megan Lara	Michelle Clark		Tadao Tomomatsu
2014	25	Hi-Yo, Silver! Celebrate Away!	Tee Morris	Lojo Russo	Kevin Roche and Andy Trembley		Susan Leabhart
2013	24	24-Karat DemiCon: Celebrating the Golden Age of Science Fiction	David Weber	Scott Ross	Mitch and Mary Thompson		Dennis Lynch
2012	23	Full Moon Fantasy	Patricia Briggs	Allen Williams	Ange and Brian Anderson		Tadao Tomomatsu
2011	22	Here Be Dragons	Sarah Prineas	Sarah Clemens	John and Denise Garner		Tadao Tomomatsu and Toastmaster Emeritus Rusty Hevelin
2010	21	Everything is Better with Pirates	Karl Schroeder	Don Maitz	Gregg Parmentier		Tadao Tomomatsu and Toastmaster Emeritus Rusty Hevelin
2009	20	All My Cons Remembered	Joe Haldeman	Sara Butcher	Roger Tener		Tadao Tomomatsu and Toastmaster Emeritus Rusty Hevelin
2008	19	Back Where We Belong	Steven Barnes	Mitchell Davidson Bentley	Joe and Inger Myers		Tadao Tomomatsu and Toastmaster Emeritus Rusty Hevelin
2007	18	You Can Go Home Again...Just Use Your Imagination	Catherine Asaro	Theresa Mather	Steve Houle (aka Wookie)		Tadao Tomomatsu and Toastmaster Emeritus Rusty Hevelin
2006	17	Enter the Twilight Zone of Imagination	Frederik Pohl	Janet Chui	Ted Poovey and Darice Schirber-Poovey		Tadao Tomomatsu and Toastmaster Emeritus Rusty Hevelin
2005	16	Life, the Universe, and DemiCon	Brad Linaweaver	Mike Cole	Sheila Lenkman and Scott Corwin		Tadao Tomomatsu and Toastmaster Emeritus Rusty Hevelin
2004	15	DemiCon-A-Fan-alistic-XV-Fun-A-Liscious	Emma Bull and Will Shetterly	Alan Gutierrez	Rusty Hevelin		Tadao Tomomatsu
2003	14	Contemplating the FUTURE	Octavia E. Butler	Lubov	Lynda Sherman		Rusty Hevelin
2002	13	Con of the Living Dead	F. Paul Wilson	Alan M. Clark	Dennis Lynch		Rusty Hevelin
2001	12	DemiCon 2001: A Con Oddity	Harry Harrison	Sergey Poyarkov	Tadao Tomomatsu		Rusty Hevelin
2000	11	Y2K Compliance is Futile. This One Goes to Eleven.	Lois McMaster Bujold	Susan Van Camp	Alois and Wendy Tschampl		Rusty Hevelin
1999	10	Generation X: Too Old to be Neos...Too Young to be Nostalgic!	Spider Robinson and Jeanne Robinson	Néné Thomas	Bill Broughton		Rusty Hevelin
1998	9	Plan Nine from Des Moines	George Alec Effinger	William J. Hodgson	Marshall and Dee Willis		Rusty Hevelin
1997	8	Sorry, But We've Chosen Not to Become Evolved - Supporting Your Eternal Right to Entropy	Barbara Hambly	Mitchell Davidson Bentley	Charles Piehl		Rusty Hevelin
1996	7	God created the heavens and the earth in 6 days...DemiCon VII. We may have taken 6 years with DemiCon, but on the Seventh Con, We'll Party.	Algis Budrys	Keith Berdak	Otto and Ruth Sheller		Rusty Hevelin
1995	6	The Undiscovered Con	Roger Zelazny		Wilson Tucker		Rusty Hevelin
1994	5	The Fifth of DemiCon: The Smoothest Convention Around	Glen Cook	David Lee Anderson	Pierre and Sandy Pettinger		Rusty Hevelin
1993	4	The Dawn of Fan	Mickey Zucker Reichert	Erin McKee	Mark Moore		Rusty Hevelin
1992	3	My God! - It's Full of Stars	Rob Chilson	David Cherry	Myrna Logan (The Dragon Lady)		Rusty Hevelin
1991	2	The Voyage Continues	Joe Haldeman	Lucy Synk	Gay Haldeman		Rusty Hevelin
1990	1	Witness the Birth	C. J. Cherryh	J.R. Daniels			Rusty Hevelin

== See also ==
- Rusty Hevelin
- Tadao Tomomatsu
- Science fiction convention
- Science fiction fandom
- Fan convention
