= Penguicon =

Primarily sci-fi and coding-based convention

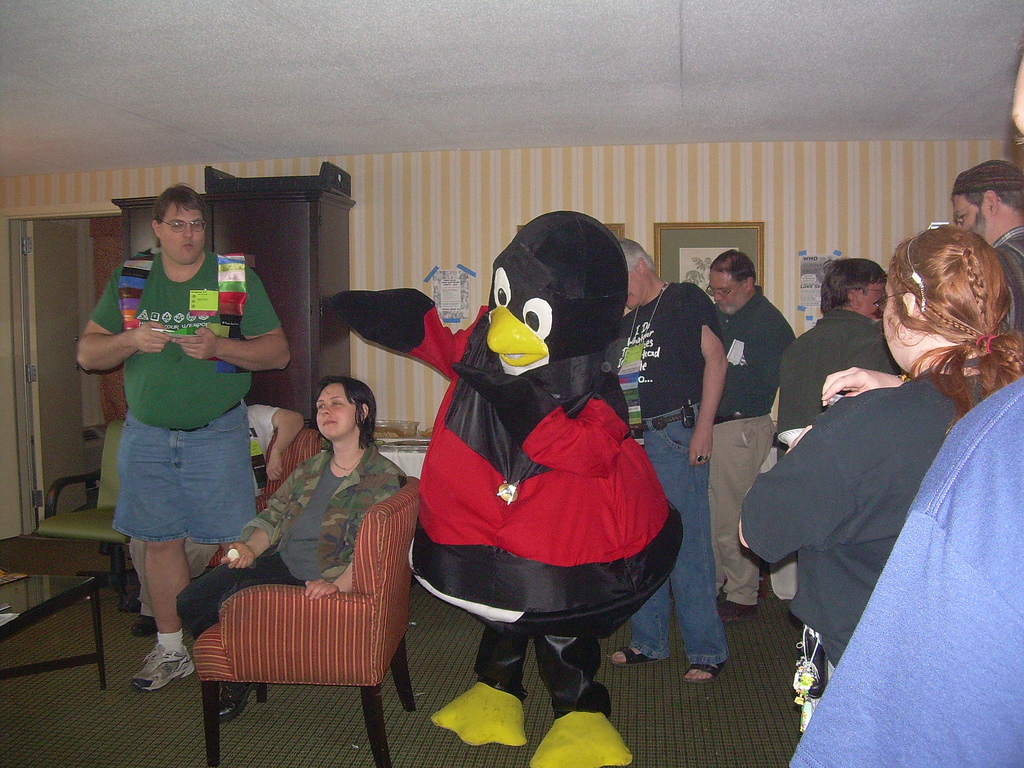
- Tux visits the Penguicon Consuite
- Status: Active
- Genre: Science fiction, Linux User Group
- Venue: Westin Southfield Hotel, Southfield, Michigan (since 2014)
- Location: Southeastern Michigan
- Country: United States
- Inaugurated: 2003; 23 years ago
- Attendance: 1550 (2016)
- Organizer: Penguicon Staff
- Filing status: Non-profit
- Website: penguicon.org

Penguicon is a convention in southeastern Michigan designed originally to mix the communities of the science fiction fandom and Linux user groups. In addition to educational panels on science fiction in the media, attendees participate in professional and beginner-level panels on Linux and open-source software. Penguicon takes its name both from a Monty Python sketch and from Tux, the penguin mascot of Linux.

Penguicon is held in the spring in the Detroit, Michigan metropolitan area. The venue, a hotel, has changed from year to year, but since 2014 the event has been held at the Westin Southfield Hotel in Southfield, Michigan.

Since its founding, Penguicon has expanded its focus to include panels and events for foodies, cosplay, filk music (the folk music of science fiction fandom), gaming, and makerspaces. Penguicon has been described as a place where "hackers, makers, foodies, open source software junkies, anime buffs, and science fiction fans of all ages and backgrounds come together in a hotel for a weekend and totally blow the roof off."

Along with the panels, the convention has hosted Artemis spaceship bridge simulations, biohacking presentations, retrogaming rooms, and a life-size Operation game board.

Working alongside local makerspaces i3Detroit and All Hands Active, Penguicon has offered instruction in learning to solder electronic components, which allowed attendees to create their own LED badges.

Over a thousand participants have attended past conventions, which have featured Guests of Honor from Neil Gaiman and John Scalzi to Jon "maddog" Hall and Eric S. Raymond.

== Recent events ==
For the 2014 convention, the Penguicon tech track's focus was on privacy and cryptography. Guests of Honor included Ernie Cline, author of Ready Player One; and Eva Galperin of the Electronic Frontier Foundation.

== Philanthropy ==
Penguicon was listed as a Guardian of Wildlife at the Detroit Zoo in 2013 for donating to symbolically adopt a penguin.

In 2013, Penguicon listed the New Beginnings Animal Rescue as their official charity, and Penguicon members donated $700 and 123 pounds of food during the convention weekend.

Penguicon was also a sponsor of MHacks III, a weekend-long hackathon held in Detroit in January 2014.

The organization Enabling the Future, which constructs 3D printed prosthetic hands for those in need, was Penguicon's 2015 Hack of Honor and official sponsored charity. Along with collecting donations, Penguicon worked with Enabling the Future and community members to 3D print limbs leading up to and during the 2015 convention.

== Featured guests ==
Every year, Penguicon invites a dozen or more people (authors, hackers, and entertainers) who are not full Guests of Honor, but are celebrities in their own right, and calls them Featured Guests (formerly "Nifty Guests"). They also invite former Guests of Honor as "Guest of Honor Emeritus". In 2010, this included author Jim C. Hines, musician Tom Smith, and open source advocate Eric S. Raymond.

== Wil Wheaton's cancellations ==
Penguicon has invited Wil Wheaton as a guest of honor multiple times, but he has had to cancel each time. In 2009, Wheaton had to cancel the morning of the convention and wrote an apology letter which was read aloud at Opening Ceremonies.

== Tron Guy ==
Jay Maynard debuted his self-made electroluminescent Tron Guy costume at Penguicon in 2004. After submitting photos of himself to Slashdot, he appeared in costume on Jimmy Kimmel Live. He has also been on America's Got Talent and a commercial for Duck Brand duct tape. Maynard says he "hasn't missed a Penguicon, and doesn't intend to."

== In the media ==
A Science Channel show, Outrageous Acts of Science, replayed a video from Penguicon 2006 in which Nifty Guest Howard Tayler recorded attendees dumping the remains of a dewar of liquid nitrogen into the hotel swimming pool. In 2010, Howard Tayler returned to Penguicon as a Guest of Honor and hosted a second video involving liquid nitrogen and the hotel swimming pool.

== Penguicon events ==
Year	Chair	Location	Dates	Guests of honor	Website
2003	Tracy Worcester	Van Dyke Park Suites - Warren, Michigan	May 2–4	Eric S. Raymond, Rob "CmdrTaco" Malda, Terry Pratchett, J. D. Frazer, Pete Abrams	Penguicon 1
2004		Sheraton Detroit - Novi, Michigan	April 16–18	Jeff "Hemos" Bates, Jon "maddog" Hall, Neil Gaiman, Steve Jackson, Wil Wheaton (cancelled)	Penguicon 2
2005	Bill Putt	Sheraton Detroit - Novi, Michigan	April 22–24	Nat Torkington, Dr. Peter Salus, Cory Doctorow, Joan D. Vinge, Rod Roddenberry, Kevin Siembieda, Wil Wheaton (cancelled)	Penguicon 3
2006	Aaron Thul	Livonia Holiday Inn - Livonia, Michigan	April 21–23	Chris DiBona, Frank Hayes, Steve Miller, Sharon Lee, Andy Looney, Kristin Looney, Alison "Looney" Frane (Looney Labs)	Penguicon 4
2007	phecda	Troy Hilton - Troy, Michigan	April 20–22	Bruce Schneier, Charlie Stross, Elizabeth Bear, Christine Peterson, Steve Jackson, Randy Milholland	Penguicon 5
2008	Keri Springer	Troy Hilton - Troy, Michigan	April 18–20	Benjamin Mako Hill, Jono Bacon, Vernor Vinge, Tamora Pierce, Randall Munroe, Keith Baker, Zeusaphone	Penguicon 6
2009	Matt Arnold	Crown Plaza Hotel - Romulus, MI	May 1–3	Rasmus Lerdorf, Jon "maddog" Hall, Andrew Hackard, Jane McGonigal, Wil Wheaton (cancelled), CandyFab	Penguicon 7
2010	Randy Bradakis	Troy Marriott - Troy, Michigan	April 30 – May 2	Joe Brockmeier, Marcel Gagné, Karl Schroeder, Spider Robinson (cancelled), Jeanne Robinson (cancelled), Howard Tayler, i3Detroit (Hack of Honor)	Penguicon 8
2011	Limey Zrnich	Troy Marriott - Troy, Michigan	April 29 – May 1	MC Frontalot, Brandon Sanderson, Jimmie P. Rogers, Howard Tayler	Penguicon 9
2012	Chuck Child	Regency Hyatt - Dearborn, Michigan	April 27–29	John Scalzi, Jim Gettys, Scrub Club Records, Open Soda (Hack of Honor)	Penguicon 10
2013	Nuri Gocay	Marriott Centerpoint - Auburn Hills, Michigan	April 26–28	Jason Denzel, Jim C. Hines, Jeff Potter, Maik Schmidt, Michael W. Lucas, Nick Farr	Penguicon 11
2014	Nuri Gocay	Westin – Southfield, Michigan	May 2–4	Ernest Cline, YTCracker, Eva Galperin (Electronic Frontier Foundation), Erika Carlson (Girl Develop It Detroit founder), GameFace Labs (Hack of Honor)	Penguicon 12
2015	Nuri Gocay	Westin – Southfield, Michigan	April 24–26	Albert Manero, Charlie Jane Anders, Annalee Newitz, Aral Balkan, Enabling the Future (Hack of Honor)	Penguicon 13
2016	Scott Kennedy	Westin – Southfield, Michigan	April 29 – May 1	Ann Leckie, Sirius (Profs. Lingjia Tang, Jason Mars), Greg Gage, Catherynne M. Valente, Deb Nicholson, Ann Lemay	Penguicon 14
2017	Cylithria Dubois	Westin – Southfield, Michigan	April 28–30	Ada Palmer, Cory Doctorow, Sumana Harihareswara, Coraline Ada Ehmke (cancelled), Kevin MacLeod, Tommy Edison and Ben Churchill (Blind Film Critic), The Tricorder Project (Hack of Honor)	Penguicon 15
2018	Cassy Sinke	Westin – Southfield, Michigan	May 4–6	Mark Oshiro, Johnny Xmas, Dr. Kristine Larsen, Christine Sunu, Mary Anne Mohanraj (Writing Excuses)	Penguicon 16
2019	Jessica Roland	Westin – Southfield, Michigan	May 3–5	Saladin Ahmed, Zed Shaw, Mikey Mason, Daniel Hansen (Crafty Celts), Sophia Brueckner, Karen Corbeill	Penguicon 17
2020	Bagel Garrison	Virtual	April 24–26	Margret-Ann Miller, Jo Walton, Larry Nemecek, Christopher Webber	Penguicon 18
2021	Dave “Ska” Green	Westin – Southfield, Michigan	April 22–25	David Revoy, Chris Crawford, Casey Fiesler, Leonard Balsera, Jo Walton, Larry Nemecek	Penguicon 19
2022	Dave “Ska” Green	Westin – Southfield, Michigan	April 21–23	Nuri Gocay, Larry Nemecek, Tracy Barnett	Penguicon 20
2023	David “Ska” Green	Westin – Southfield, Michigan	April 21–23	Eric Choi, Charles J. Cohen, Ph.D., PMP, Sylvia Hubbard	Penguicon 21
2024	Bagel Garrison	Ann Arbor Marriott Ypsilanti	April 26–28	Dr. Stefani Goerlich, J. Wolfgang Goerlich, Benny Vasquez	Penguicon 22

== See also ==
- Science fiction convention
