= Trinoc*coN =

- Status: Defunct
- Genre: Science fiction
- Locations: Durham, North Carolina
- Country: United States
- Inaugurated: 2000
- Most recent: 2008
- Filing status: 501(c)3

Trinoc*coN was an annual science fiction convention which was held in North Carolina. It started in 2000. Guests of honor included George R.R. Martin. 2006 was the first year that the convention was held outside of Durham; it was held in the Northern Raleigh Hilton in Raleigh, North Carolina. The name "Trinoc*coN" is a reference to the Trinocs, a fictional alien race from the works of Larry Niven. It ceased operation in 2009.

== Notable Guests ==
=== Art ===
Charles Vess (2000), Dru Blair (2001), Tom Fleming (2007), Charles Keegan (2005), James Wappel (2002), Andrew Probert (2001)

=== Comics ===
T Campbell - Penny and Aggie (2007), Greg Eatroff - FAANS.COM (2003, 2007), Barb Fischer and Chris Impink - Fragile Gravity (2007), Jade Gordon - Lean on Me (2005), Larry Holderfield ("mckenzee") - Sinister Bedfellows (2007), Gene Kannenberg - ComicsResearch (2007), Joe Komenda - Feral Chicken (2007), Arienna Lee - A World Like My Own (2007), David Milloway, Matthew Z. Wood, and Stephanie Freese - Detective (2007), Eric Nolen-Weathington - TwoMorrows Publishing (2007), Van Plexico - AvengersAssemble (2007), Leah Riley - Willrad and RoboHobo (2007), Brian Shearer and Marty Blevins - GravyBoy (2007), Jamie Robertson - Clan of the Cats (2007), Ursula Vernon - Digger (2003), Charles Vess - Web of Spider-Man (2000)

=== Gaming ===
Dave Arneson (2002, 2005), Bruce Baugh (2003), Chris Pramas (2005), Skip Williams (2000)

=== Literary ===
Lois McMaster Bujold (2002), Fred Chappell (2002), David Drake (2000, 2006), Elizabeth Hand (2007), David G. Hartwell (2006), John Kessel (2006, 2007), K. A. Laity (2007), Sharon Lee (2004), Barry N. Malzberg (2006), George R.R. Martin (2007), Steve Miller (2004), James Morrow (2000), Stephen Mark Rainey (2007), Alexandra Sokoloff (2007), Michael Swanwick (2000), Vernor Vinge (2001), Lawrence Watt-Evans (2002), Alex Wilson (2007), Joe R. Lansdale (2005), Catherine Asaro (2008)

== Events ==
Memorial to Jim Baen

Charity auction
