= MarsCon (Bloomington, Minnesota) =

Science fiction convention in Minnesota, US

Coordinates: 44°51′33″N 93°15′9″W

- Genre: Science fiction
- Location: Bloomington, Minnesota
- Country: United States
- Inaugurated: 1999
- Website: marscon.org

MarsCon is a science fiction convention held in Bloomington, Minnesota, United States. It was first held in February 1999 with the goal of appealing to a diverse audience of fans in Minnesota and the vicinity. It is a mid-sized convention with a wide variety of events including panel discussions, guest of honor presentations, music of many kinds, art show, film room (including anime), science room, dealers room, charity auction, and a masquerade. Past guests have included actors, authors, artists, scientists, musicians, producers, and even the occasional pooka. The Minneapolis Star-Tribune describes MarsCon as "for the sci-fi serious nerds".

Since 2003, MarsCon Minnesota has also included a strong presence of the "Dementia" (comedy/novelty/filk) music genre, making the convention one of the largest events in the country to showcase such music.

== Conventions ==
=== Past ===
MarsCon 1999: Celebrating 60 Years of Fandom

Where: Radisson South Hotel
When: February 26–28, 1999
Guests of Honor: Carl David, Jeff Grubb, Kate Novak

MarsCon 2000: Don't Panic! (Alternate Subversive Theme: M’00)

Where: Radisson South Hotel
When: May 12–14, 2000
Guests of Honor: Mark Allen Shepherd, Lisa Getto, Margaret Weis, Don Perrin, Denise Boie, Jack Borkowski, Donald R. Schmitt, Chesley Bonestell (Posthumous)

MarsCon 2001: A Space Oddity

Where: Radisson South Hotel
When: May 11–13, 2001
Guests of Honor: Jane Yolen, Bill Blair, Carl Talliaferro, Christopher Jones, Michael Liebmann, David Arneson, Stanley Kubrick (Posthumous)

MarsCon 2002: The Magic of Fantasy

Where: Airport Hilton
When: March 1–3, 2002
Guests of Honor: Lyda Morehouse, Peter Woodward, John Levene, Robin Wood, Harvey (See Harvey (play))

MarsCon 2003: No One Here is Exactly What He Appears

Where: Holiday Inn Select
When: February 28-March 2, 2003
Guests of Honor: Sharon Lee, Steve Miller (science fiction writer), Julie Caitlin Brown, Lev Mailer, John Garner (artist), David Mendez, Douglas Adams (Posthumous)

MarsCon 2004: Let's Play Doctor!

Where: Airport Hilton
When: March 5–7, 2004
Guests of Honor: John M. Ford, Richard Biggs, Barry Hansen “Dr. Demento”, Dawn Devine Brown “Davina (costumer)”, Luke Sienkowski “The Great Luke Ski”, David E Romm

MarsCon 2005: Galactic Pirates and Mercenaries

Where: Airport Marriott
When: March 4–6, 2005
Guests of Honor: Richard Herd, Jeremy Bulloch, Stephanie Gannaway-Osborn, Timothy Zahn, Todd Coss, The Great Luke Ski, Ron Ross, Herbert Jefferson, Jr.

MarsCon 2006: Things That Go Bump in the Night

Where: Holiday Inn Select
When: March 3–5, 2006
Guests of Honor: Gigi Edgley, Dean Haglund, Beth Hansen, Walter H. Hunt, Paul Lawrence (producer), Tom Smith (filker), Hugh Gregory

MarsCon 2007

Where: Holiday Inn Select
When: March 2–4, 2007
Guests of Honor: Don S. Davis, Patricia Tallman, Todd Lockwood, Eric Larson, Eleanor Arnason, Ookla the Mok

MarsCon 2008: Press Start To Continue

Where: Holiday Inn Select
When: February 29-March 2, 2008
Guests of Honor: Bill Blair, Jeff Easley, Naomi Kritzer, C. Robert Cargill, Hot Waffles

MarsCon 2009: Invasion!

Where: Holiday Inn Select
When: March 6–8, 2009
Guests of Honor: Musetta Vander, Scott Rosema, Suzanne Hiza-Rezema, Jeanne Cavelos, Wally Pleasant

MarsCon 2010: Dark Lords and Femme Fatales

Where: Holiday Inn Select
When: March 5–7, 2010
Guests of Honor: John Garner, Loretta McKibben, Nick Atoms, Gwynyth Walsh

MarsCon 2011: Days of Magic!

Where: Holiday Inn Select
When: March 4–6, 2011
Guests of Honor: Lois McMaster Bujold, Joe Rheault, Megan Rheault, Bjo Trimble, John Trimble, Worm Quartet

MarsCon 2012: Rockin' the Apocalypse

Where: Crowne Plaza Hotel and Suites
When: March 9–12, 2012
Guests of Honor: Lukas Effinger, Catherine Asaro, Rob Callahan, Consortium of Genius

MarsCon 2013: Ctrl/Alt/Del... Thriving into the future

Where: Crowne Plaza Hotel and Suites, 3 Appletree Square, Bloomington, MN 55425
When: March 1–3, 2013
Guests of Honor: actress Claudia Christian, author Harry Turtledove, science author Gerald Nordley, artist Sarah Clemens, comic artist W.C. Carani, fan/costuming The Thrift Brothers, and music Flat 29.

MarsCon 2014: Time is the Key

Where: DoubleTree by Hilton, Bloomington-Minneapolis South
When: March 7–9, 2014
Guests of Honor: J. G. Hertzler, Esther Friesner, Mickie Erickson, Rae Lundquist, Henry Phillips, Dave Duca, Bridget Landry, and the Klingons of IKV RakeHell.

MarsCon 2015: Heroes & Wizerds & Fae OHhh MYyy!!

Where: Airport Hilton
When: March 6–8, 2015
Guests of Honor: Spice Williams-Crosby, Antoinette Bower, Robert Odegard, Lyda Morehouse, Richard Tatge, Eric Wile, Rob Paravonian, Dave Duca, and Mike Glielmi.

MarsCon 2016: Parallel Dimensions

Where: Hilton Minneapolis/St Paul Airport/Mall of America, 3800 American Blvd. E., Bloomington, MN 55425
When: March 4–6, 2016
Guests of Honor: actor William Morgan Sheppard, artist Christine Mitzuk, author Ruth Berman, filmmaker Christopher R. Mihm, game designer Eric Wile, musician Luke Ski, propmasters Dave Brown, Dave Duca, Michael Glielmi, and Ann Neubauer.

MarsCon 2017: Dragons In Space

Where: Hilton Minneapolis/St Paul Airport/Mall of America, 3800 American Blvd. E., Bloomington, MN 55425
When: March 3–5, 2017
Guests of Honor: actor Jeffrey Combs, artist Ralph Ryan, authors Sharon Lee & Steve Miller, comedy and music Judy Tenuta, sciences Benjamin Higginbotham & Cariann Higginbotham

MarsCon 2018: Robots, Rayguns, & Rockets: The 3 R's of Sci-Fi

Where: Hilton Minneapolis/St Paul Airport/Mall of America, 3800 American Blvd. E., Bloomington, MN 55425
When: March 2–4, 2018
Guests of Honor: actor Roger Cross, artist Steve Thomas, author MaryJanice Davidson, musician Brent brentalfloss Black, planetary scientist Bridget Landry

MarsCon 2019: "Legends In Our Own Mind"

Where: Hilton Minneapolis/St Paul Airport/Mall of America, 3800 American Blvd. E., Bloomington, MN 55425
When: March 1–3, 2019
Guests of Honor: actors Bill Blair & J. G. Hertzler, author A. Merc Rustad, artist Luke Ski

MarsCon 2020 "Visions of the Future"

Where: Hilton Minneapolis/St Paul Airport/Mall of America, 3800 American Blvd. E., Bloomington, MN 55425
When: February 28 - March 2, 2020
Guests of Honor: actor Lee Arenberg, artist Darla Ecklund, author Kathryn Sullivan, fan Eric M. Heideman, musician Lauren Mayer

MarsCon 2021 "Forces of Darkness"

Where: Virtually
When: March 12–14, 2021
Guests of Honor: Robbie Ellis and Jon Sloan

Marscon 2022 "The Future Ain’t What It Used to Be"

Where: Hilton Minneapolis/St Paul Airport/Mall of America, 3800 American Blvd. E., Bloomington, MN 55425
When: March 11–13, 2022
Guests of Honor: artist Jon Sloan, author Catherine Lundoff, media guest Michael Moore, musicians TV's Kyle and Lindzilla

MarsCon 2023 “When Books Come Alive”

Where Hilton Minneapolis/St Paul Mall of America
When: March 10–12, 2023
