= Rusty Hevelin =

American science fiction publisher and collector

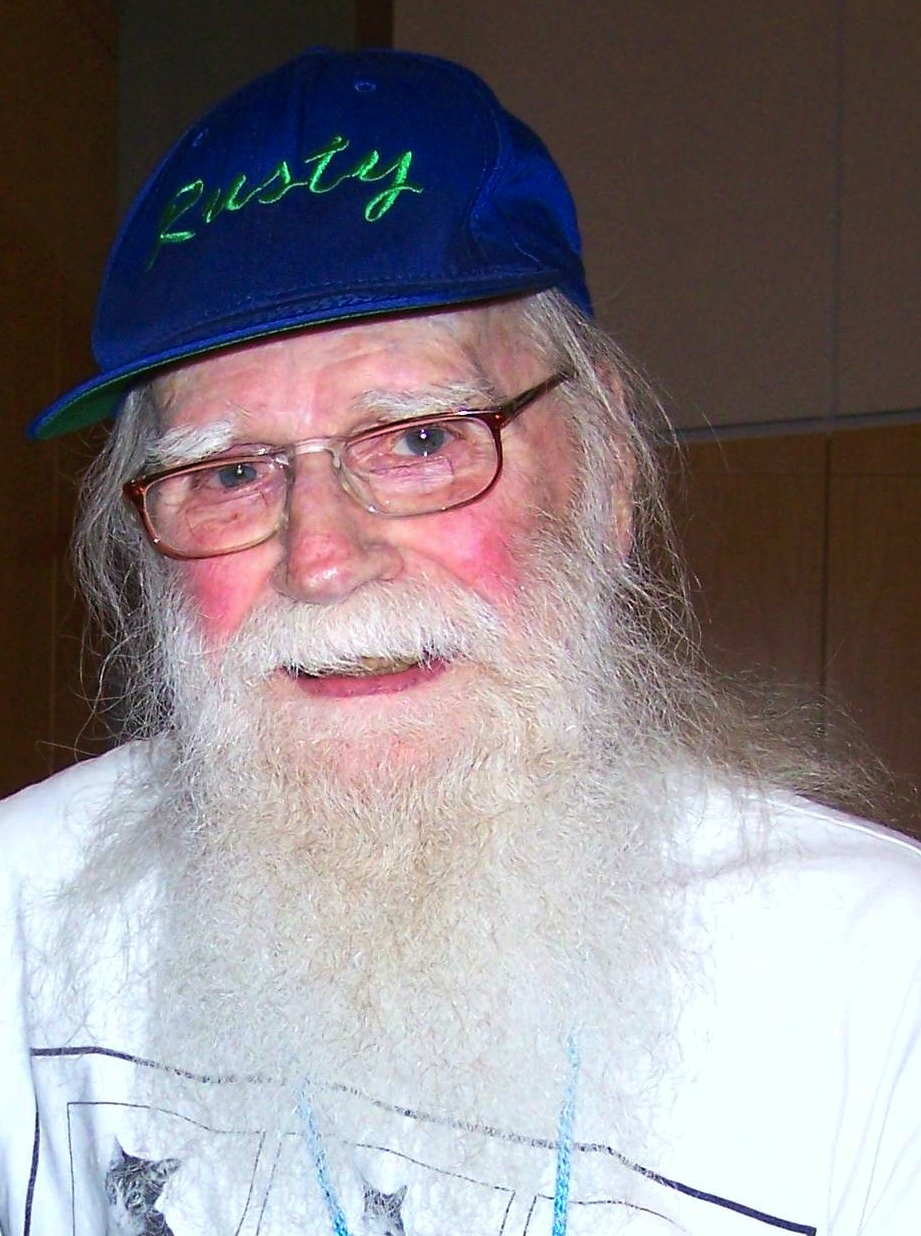
- Rusty Hevelin at the 2008 Worldcon, Denvention 3 (Photo by William S. Higgins)
- Born: James LeRoy Hevelin; February 16, 1922; Imperial County, California
- Died: December 27, 2011 (aged 89); Dayton, Ohio
- Children: 4

James LeRoy "Rusty" Hevelin (February 16, 1922 – December 27, 2011) was a science fiction fan, fanzine publisher, collector and huckster.

== Career ==
Hevelin was an active member of the science fiction community from the early 1940s, publishing his own fanzines such as H-1661, as well as contributing to many others. He had been Fan Guest of Honor and Toastmaster at so many science fiction conventions that everyone (including Hevelin) lost count. He was the Fan Guest of Honor at the 1981 Worldcon, Denvention Two (he had attended Denvention One in 1941). He was particularly likely to participate in panel discussions on the history of fandom and fanzines, and in panels of the form, "So: This Is Your First Convention? Here's What To Expect." Hevelin was the 1986 recipient of the Big Heart Award for service to the science fiction community. He was well known as a collector of science fiction materials, and was the recipient of First Fandom's 2003 Sam Moskowitz Archive Award for excellence in science fiction collecting.

== Legacy ==
Hevelin was one of the founders of PulpCon, an annual convention dedicated to pulp magazines. In 2012, PulpFest announced they would be renaming the Munsey Award, which has been given annually to a person who has given of himself or herself for the betterment of the pulp community. The new name for the award was to be the Rusty Hevelin Service Award. The Munsey Award survives, but the Rusty Hevelin Service Award has been introduced as a new award.

His collection of pulps, fanzines, and science fiction books became part of the University of Iowa Library Special Collections and University Archives in April 2012. The library is digitizing the Hevelin Collection's approximately 10,000 fanzines, for the benefit of scholars and fans alike; and the Collection has its own frequently-updated Tumblr page.

The 2012 Liaden universe novel Dragon Ship by Sharon Lee and Steve Miller is dedicated to Hevelin (and to Anne McCaffrey). One of the supporting characters in the novel is a telepathic non-human creature named Havelin, described as graying (younger members of the species have rusty-colored hair), old and knowledgeable.

== Personal life ==
Hevelin was a veteran of World War II who served as a Marine in the South Pacific. After the war he attended Antioch College, where he knew Rod Serling and dated Coretta Scott (well before she met Martin Luther King Jr.). He had four grown sons, John, Scott, Bruce, and Will.
