= Tadao Tomomatsu =

American actor

- Occupations: Film, television actor

Tadao Tomomatsu is an actor, instructor, and science fiction personality living in the Los Angeles, California area.

== Career ==
Tadao has appeared in Diagnosis: Murder, The Tracey Ullman Show, the films Inspector Gadget and Godzilla, and many others.

In 2006, Tadao appeared on Heroes in the episode "Don't Look Back", where he played Detective Furokawa, a Japanese-American police officer who translated for Hiro Nakamura.

His biggest role to date was as "Mr. Shake Hands Man 2" on the show Banzai. He replaced the original Mr. Shake Hands Man, as he had become too well known.

== Science fiction ==
When Tadao is not working as an actor, he is actively involved in science fiction fandom. Tadao can regularly be found at the Los Angeles Science Fantasy Society clubhouse in North Hollywood during meetings and/or events. He is also regularly a staff member at many fan-run conventions, including Loscon, Gallifrey One, Anime Los Angeles, DemiCon, plus many Worldcons and Westercons. He was the Toastmaster at BayCon 2010. and Fan Guest of Honor in 2011 at Kansas City's ConQuesT 42. He served as Toastmaster as ConQuesT 45 in 2014.
