= Sharon Lee (writer) =

American novelist

- Born: Sharon Lee Backof; September 11, 1952 (age 73); Baltimore, Maryland, U.S.
- Education: University of Maryland, Baltimore County
- Occupation: Writer
- Spouse: Steve Miller
- Writing career
- Period: 1979–present
- Genres: Fantasy, science fiction
- Website: sharonleewriter.com

Sharon Lee (born September 11, 1952) is an American science fiction, fantasy and mystery author who lived in Winslow, Maine from 1988 to 2018 before moving to nearby Waterville. She is the co-author (with Steve Miller) of the Liaden universe novels and stories, as well as other works, and individually the author of several mystery and fantasy novels.

== Background ==
Born Sharon Lee Backof in Baltimore, Maryland, Lee graduated from Parkville Senior High School in 1970, and attended University of Maryland, Baltimore County during the late 1970s while employed as Administrative Aide to the Dean of the School of Social Work and Community Planning at the UMAB Professional Schools in downtown Baltimore. Sharon Lee and Steve Miller were married in 1980. In 1988, they relocated to central Maine, living in Winslow. In early 2018, they moved "into town" to nearby Waterville (on the other side of the Kennebec River).

Throughout her life, Lee has been employed as various flavors of secretary, as well as advertising copywriter, call-in talk hostess, nightside news copy editor, freelance reporter, photographer, book reviewer, and deliverer of tractor trailers. Beginning in August 1997, she served three years as the executive director of Science Fiction and Fantasy Writers of America, and was subsequently elected vice president, then president of that organization.

Lee's first professional fiction publication was "A Matter of Ceremony," Amazing Stories, 1980. Her most notable works to date are the books in the Liaden Universe, written in conjunction with her husband, Steve Miller, published by Baen Books, and which are considered part of the space opera sub-genre. Lee and Miller also co-authored the Fey Duology - Duainfey and Longeye. Lee has written a contemporary fantasy series based in Maine - Carousel series (Archer's Beach), which includes 3 novels published by Baen Books and several short stories. In addition, she has written two Maine-based mystery novels—Barnburner and Gunshy—and several dozen short stories.

== Bibliography ==
=== Carousel series (Archer's Beach) ===
- Carousel Tides (2010) (ISBN 9781439133958)
- Carousel Sun (2014) (ISBN 9781476736235)
- Carousel Seas (2014) (ISBN 9781476736969)
- Surfside (2013) ASIN B00EN3RVMK
- The Gift of Magic (2015) ASIN B012AYSJRO
- Spell Bound (2016) ASIN B01KBSR90E

=== Jen Pierce Mysteries ===
(based in Maine)

- Barnburner (2002) (ISBN 978-1-935224-93-8)
- Gunshy (2006) (ISBN 978-1-935224-94-5)

=== Liaden Universe novels ===
(coauthored with Steve Miller)

==== Agent of Change Sequence ====
- Agent of Change (1988)
- Conflict of Honors (1988)
- Carpe Diem (1989)
- Plan B (1999)
- I Dare (2002)
- Local Custom (2002)
- Scout's Progress (2002)
- Mouse and Dragon (2010) ISBN 978-1451637595
- Partners in Necessity (Omnibus edition of Agent of Change, Conflict of Honors, and Carpe Diem) (2000)
- Pilot's Choice (Omnibus edition of Local Custom and Scout's Progress) (2001)
- The Dragon Variation (Omnibus edition of Local Custom, Scout's Progress and Conflict of Honors) (2010)
- The Agent Gambit (Omnibus edition of Agent of Change, Carpe Diem) (2011) ISBN 978-1439134078
- Korval's Game (Omnibus edition of Plan B and I Dare) (2011)

==== The Great Migration ====
- Crystal Soldier (2005)
- Crystal Dragon (2006)
- The Crystal Variation (Omnibus edition of Crystal Soldier, Crystal Dragon and Balance of Trade) (20110901)

==== Other Liad novels ====
- Necessity's Child (2013)
- Theo Waitley
  - Fledgling (2009)
  - Saltation (2010)
  - Ghost Ship (2011)
  - Dragon Ship (2012)
  - Dragon in Exile (2015)
  - Alliance of Equals (2016) ISBN 978-1476781488 ASIN 1476781486
  - The Gathering Edge (2017) ASIN B06Y249HZK
  - Neogenesis (2018) ASIN B077Z7WYY9
- Accepting the Lance (2019) ISBN 978-1982124212
- Trader's Leap (2020) ISBN 978-1982125011
- Jethri Gobelyn
  - Balance of Trade (2004) ASIN B00WL0CA46
  - Trade Secret (2013), ISBN 978-1451639292

==== Liaden Universe Short Story Collections ====
- A Liaden Universe Constellation (2013)
- A Liaden Universe Constellation, Volume 2 (2014)
- A Liaden Universe Constellation, Volume 3 (2015)
- A Liaden Universe Constellation, Volume 4 (2019)
- A Liaden Universe Constellation, Volume 5 (2022)

=== The Fey Duology ===
(coauthored with Steve Miller)

- Duainfey
- Longeye

=== Other Novels coauthored with Steve Miller ===
- The Tomorrow Log (2003)
- The Sword of Orion (2005)

=== Anthology co-edited with Steve Miller ===
- Low Port (2003)

== Awards and recognition ==
Year	Organization	Award title, Category	Work	Result	Refs
1981	Fool-Con	Balrog Award, Short Fiction	A Matter of Ceremony	Nominated	
2002	Romantic Times	Romantic Times Book Club Reviewers Choice Award for Best Science Fiction Novel	Scout's Progress	Won	
2002	Fantasy, Futuristic and Paranormal (FF&P) Chapter of the Romance Writers of America	Prism Award	Scout's Progress	Won	
2002	Fantasy, Futuristic and Paranormal (FF&P) Chapter of the Romance Writers of America	Prism Award	Local Custom	Nominated	
2005	Golden Duck Award	Hal Clement Award	Balance of Trade	Won	
2010	Golden Duck Award	Hal Clement Award	Fledgling	Nominated	
2011	SF Site	SF Site Reader's Poll	Saltation	Nominated	
2012	SF Site	SF Site Reader's Poll	Ghost Ship	Won	
2012	Edward E. Smith Memorial Award	Skylark	n/a	Won	
2013	SF Site	SF Site Reader's Poll	Dragon Ship	Won	
2014	Locus (magazine)	Locus Award, Science Fiction Novel	Trade Secret	Nominated	
2014	Locus (magazine)	Locus Award, Science Fiction Novel	Necessity's Child	Nominated	
2025	Heinlein Society	Robert A. Heinlein Award	n/a	Won	

=== Science fiction conventions ===
She and Steve Miller have been a Guest of Honor or Special Guest at a number of science fiction conventions, including: SiliCon (1998); SheVaCon (2000, 2003); Albacon (2002); Balticon (2003, 2016); MarsCon (2003, 2017); PortConME (2004, 2011); CONduit and Trinoc*coN (2004); Penguicon and COSine (2006); Stellarcon (2009); DucKon and Oasis (2010); ConQuesT and Chattacon (2012); Philcon (2014); Ravencon (2016); and ConFluence (2017).

== On fan fiction ==
Lee and Miller strongly oppose fan fiction written in their universe, with Sharon Lee stating on her website "I don’t want 'other people interpreting' our characters. Interpreting our characters is what Steve and I do; it’s our job. Nobody else is going to get it right. This may sound rude and elitist, but honestly, it’s not easy for us to get it right sometimes, and we’ve been living with these characters... for a very long time... We built our universes, and our characters; they are our intellectual property; and they are not toys lying about some virtual sandbox for other kids to pick up and modify at their whim. Steve and I do not sanction fanfic written in our universes; any such work that exists, exists without our permission, and certainly without our support."
