= Steve Miller (science fiction writer) =

American science fiction writer (1950–2024)

- Born: July 31, 1950; Baltimore, Maryland, U.S.
- Died: February 20, 2024 (aged 73); Waterville, Maine, U.S.
- Education: University of Maryland, Baltimore County
- Occupation: Writer
- Spouse: Sharon Lee
- Writing career
- Period: 1978–2024
- Genres: Fantasy, science fiction
- Website: korval.com

Steve Miller (July 31, 1950 – February 20, 2024) was an American science fiction writer from Waterville, Maine, best known for his works set in the Liaden universe, written in collaboration with his wife Sharon Lee.

== Background ==
Steve Miller was born on July 31, 1950, in Baltimore, Maryland. He attended Franklin High School in Reisterstown, Maryland, graduating in 1968; and the University of Maryland, Baltimore County in the late 1960s and 1970s, where he was news editor and managing editor of the campus newspaper, The Retriever and founding president of the Infinity Circle, the school's first science fiction club. He served as founding Curator of the UMBC Albin O. Kuhn Library & Gallery's science fiction research collection. Miller was an active member of science fiction fandom for many years, serving as Director of Information of the Baltimore Science Fiction Society for some years, and as vice-chair of the bid committee to hold the 38th World Science Fiction Convention in Baltimore (they lost to Boston).

Miller married Baltimore-area science fiction fan Sue Nice in 1975; they divorced in 1979. He and Sharon Lee were married in 1980. In 1988, they relocated to central Maine, living for some time in Winslow, Maine. In early 2018, they moved "into town" to nearby Waterville (on the other side of the Kennebec River). Steve Miller died in Waterville on February 20, 2024, at the age of 73.

== Writing ==
In 1973, Miller attended the Clarion West Writers Workshop. He sold short fiction to semi-professional markets, and wrote for science fiction fanzines, before selling a short story, "Charioteer" to Amazing Stories (May 1978 issue). He has since published dozens of novels and over 50 short stories, as well as book reviews, essays and other non-fiction; much (though not all) in collaboration with Lee. He has also collaborated with Lee on some non-Liaden works.

=== On fan fiction ===
Miller and Lee strongly oppose fan fiction written in their universe. In Lee's words:

I don't want "other people interpreting" our characters. Interpreting our characters is what Steve and I do; it's our job. Nobody else is going to get it right. This may sound rude and elitist, but honestly, it’s not easy for us to get it right sometimes, and we've been living with these characters ... for a very long time ... We built our universes, and our characters; they are our intellectual property; and they are not toys lying about some virtual sandbox for other kids to pick up and modify at their whim. Steve and I do not sanction fanfic written in our universes; any such work that exists, exists without our permission, and certainly without our support.

== Publishing ==
Miller ran a small press from 1995 through 2012, specializing in chapbooks containing two to three short stories set in the Liaden Universe, and other settings from books by him, Sharon Lee and other authors. The works published under this imprint by Miller and Lee have been published as ebooks in editions from Baen Books following the termination of operations of SRM Publishers, Ltd.

== Works ==
=== Liaden Universe novels ===
(coauthored with Sharon Lee)

Agent of Change Sequence

- Agent of Change (1988) ISBN 978-0441009916
- Conflict of Honors (1988) ISBN 978-0441009640
- Carpe Diem (1989) ISBN 978-0441010226
- Plan B (1999) ISBN 978-1892065001
- I Dare (2002) ISBN 978-0441010851
- Local Custom (2002) ISBN 978-0965725576
- Scout's Progress (2002) ISBN 978-0441009275
- Mouse and Dragon (2010) ISBN 978-1451637595

Omnibus Editions

- Partners in Necessity (Omnibus edition of Agent of Change, Conflict of Honors, and Carpe Diem) (2000) ISBN 978-1892065018
- Pilot's Choice (Omnibus edition of Local Custom and Scout's Progress) (2001) ISBN 978-1892065025
- The Dragon Variation (Omnibus edition of Local Custom, Scout's Progress and Conflict of Honors) (2010) ISBN 978-1439133699
- The Agent Gambit (Omnibus edition of Agent of Change, Carpe Diem) (2011) ISBN 978-1439134078
- Korval's Game (Omnibus edition of Plan B and I Dare) (2011) ISBN 978-1439134399

The Great Migration Duology

- Crystal Soldier (2005) ISBN 1592220843
- Crystal Dragon (2006) ISBN 978-0441015498
- The Crystal Variation (Omnibus edition of Crystal Soldier, Crystal Dragon and Balance of Trade) (20110901) ISBN 978-1439134634

Other

- Balance of Trade (2004) ISBN 978-1592220205
- Trade Secret (2013) ISBN 978-1476737041
- Fledgling (2009) ISBN 978-1439133439
- Saltation (2010) ISBN 978-1439134528
- Ghost Ship (2011) ISBN 978-1451637922
- Dragon Ship (2012) ISBN 978-1451639186
- Necessity's Child (2014) ISBN 978-1476736310
- Dragon in Exile (2015) ISBN 978-1476780719
- Alliance of Equals (2016) ISBN 978-1476781488
- The Gathering Edge (2017) ISBN 978-1476782188
- Neogenesis (2018) ISBN 978-1481482783
- Accepting the Lance (2019) ISBN 978-1982124212
- Trader's Leap (2020) ISBN 978-1982125011

=== Liaden Universe Short Story Collections ===
- A Liaden Universe Constellation (2013)
- A Liaden Universe Constellation, Volume 2 (2014)
- A Liaden Universe Constellation, Volume 3 (2015)
- A Liaden Universe Constellation, Volume 4 (2019)
- A Liaden Universe Constellation, Volume 5 (2022)

=== The Fey Duology ===
(coauthored with Sharon Lee)

- Duainfey
- Longeye

=== Other Novels coauthored with Sharon Lee ===
- The Tomorrow Log (2003)
- The Sword of Orion (2005)

=== Anthology co-edited with Sharon Lee ===
- Low Port (2003)

== Awards and honors ==
Miller (along with Lee) has received various literary awards.

Year	Organization	Award title, Category	Work	Result	Refs
2012	Edward E. Smith Memorial Award	Skylark	n/a	Won	
2014	Locus	Locus Award, Science Fiction Novel	Necessity's Child	Nominated	
2014	Locus	Locus Award, Science Fiction Novel	Trade Secret	Nominated	
1981	Fool-Con	Balrog Award, Short Fiction	A Matter of Ceremony	Nominated	
2010	Golden Duck Award	Hal Clement Award	Fledgling	Nominated	
2005	Golden Duck Award	Hal Clement Award	Balance of Trade	Won	
2013	SF Site	SF Site Reader's Poll	Dragon Ship	Won	
2012	SF Site	SF Site Reader's Poll	Ghost Ship	Won	
2011	SF Site	SF Site Reader's Poll	Saltation	Nominated	
2002	Romantic Times	Romantic Times Book Club Reviewers Choice Award for Best Science Fiction Novel	Scout's Progress	Won	
2002	Fantasy, Futuristic and Paranormal (FF&P) Chapter of the Romance Writers of America	Prism Award	Scout's Progress	Won	
2002	Fantasy, Futuristic and Paranormal (FF&P) Chapter of the Romance Writers of America	Prism Award	Local Custom	Nominated	

Miller, usually with Lee, has been a Guest of Honor or Special Guest at a number of science fiction conventions, including: SiliCon (1998); SheVaCon (2000, 2003); Albacon (2002); Balticon and MarsCon (2003); PortConME (2004, 2010); CONduit and Trinoc*coN (2004); Penguicon and COSine (2006); Stellarcon (2009); DucKon and Oasis (2010); ConQuesT and Chattacon (2012); and RavenCon (2016).
