= Liaden universe =

Science fiction series by Sharon Lee and Steve Miller

Liaden Universe (/liːˈeɪdɛn/ lee-AY-den or /liːˈeɪdən/) is an ongoing science fiction series written by Sharon Lee and Steve Miller. The books are primarily space operas with elements of Regency romance, novels of manners, and supernatural abilities.

As of July 2024, the series comprises 27 novels and 33 chapbooks. The 25th Liaden Universe novel was released in July 2023.

== Overview ==
The Liaden Universe consists of multiple related series. The first Agent of Change series is a sequence of science fiction novels by husband and wife team Sharon Lee and Steve Miller. Originally published in 1988, this series centers on the ongoing conflict between Clan Korval and the Department of the Interior, a rogue government agency.

== Publication history ==
Del Rey Books published the first three novels—Agent of Change, Conflict of Honors, and Carpe Diem—between 1988 and 1989. Due to modest initial sales, Lee and Miller did not immediately continue the series. However, interest grew through online communities, particularly the Usenet group rec.arts.sf.written, where the series was featured in the group's FAQ.

In 1999, the authors published several chapbooks and the next installment in the series, Plan B. Three more books followed, completing the Agent of Change series. The authors also wrote short stories to fill in the gaps between novels and provide background on various characters.

While the first three novels were initially published in mass-market editions by Del Rey, they were later re-published by the now-defunct Meisha Merlin, which also anthologized the earlier books. Subsequently, the novels were reissued in mass-market format by Ace Books. Some earlier works and stories were made available as e-books through Embiid Publishing.

In 2007, Baen Books began releasing the first ten Liaden novels in electronic form, followed by several short story collections. Beginning in 2009, Baen started publishing new books in the series. In 2010, Baen reissued all the earlier novels in omnibus trade paperback editions.

As of 2024, the Liaden Universe includes 26 novels, short stories, and chapbooks. All the novels are currently available as e-books.

== Authors ==
Sharon Lee and Steve Miller have co-authored more than 100 science fiction novels and short stories over the course of more than 35 years. Many have been published as anthologies as well as digitally.

Lee has also published a series of novels in another alternate fantasy setting as well as a duo of murder mysteries set in a small town in Maine.

== Books in the series ==
=== Novels ===
==== Timeline chart ====
Liaden Universe Novels & Main Characters Timeline
Cantra and Jela	Jethri Gobelyn	Clan Korval	Theo Waitley	The Kompani
Crystal Soldier				
Crystal Dragon
Many years pass
	Balance of Trade			
Trade Secret
Fair Trade
Trade Lanes (Forthcoming)
Many years pass
		Local Custom (Anne & Er Thom)		
Scouts Progress (Aelliana & Daav)
Mouse & Dragon (Aelliana & Daav)
Many years pass
Conflict of Honors (Priscilla & Shan)
Agent of Change (Val Con & Miri)
Carpe Diem (Val Con & Miri)
		Plan B (Val Con & Miri; Shan)	Fledgling	
		I Dare (Pat Rin & Natesa; Ren Zel & Anthora)	Saltation	
		Ghost Ship (Theo Waitley)		Necessity's Child (The Bedel; Nova & Syl Vor)
		Dragon Ship (Theo Waitley, Bechimo & crew)		
		Dragon in Exile	The Gathering Edge	Dragon in Exile
		Alliance of Equals	The Gathering Edge	
Neogenesis
Accepting the Lance
		Trader's Leap (Padi; Priscilla & Shan)		
Salvage Right
		Ribbon Dance (Padi; Priscilla & Shan)		
Diviner's Bow (Padi; Priscilla & Shan)

Chart notes

- Time flows down the chart, so events in novels on the same horizontal level happen (roughly) concurrently.
- The columns of the chart represent main characters and/or clans.
- Color key:
  - Red = Progenitor Universe
  - Orange = Trade Areas of Terran and Liaden space
  - Yellow = Primarily Liaden Space (with primary characters shown in parentheses)
  - Green = Theo's home world (Delgado), first journey, Anlingdin Piloting Academy, and beyond
  - Pink = Planet Surebleak
  - Blue = Planet Surebleak and wide-ranging space faring & trading
  - Gray = Trading, space faring, and A.I. mentoring

List of novels in order of the timeline of the Liaden universe

==== The Great Migration Duology ====
These two novels comprise the origin story of the Liaden universe and introduce Cantra and Jela.

- Crystal Soldier (February 2005, ISBN 978-1-5922-2083-0)
- Crystal Dragon (February 2006, ISBN 978-1-5922-2087-8)

==== Liaden novels featuring Jethri Gobelyn ====
These stories of merchants and intrigue take place between The Great Migration and Agent of Change sequences.

- Balance of Trade was published by Meisha Merlin in hardcover in February 2004 (ISBN 978-1-5922-2020-5). It won the Hal Clement Award for best Young Adult Science Fiction novel of 2004)
- Trade Secret, a sequel to Balance of Trade, was published by Baen in hardcover in November 2013 (ISBN 978-1-4516-3929-2).
- Fair Trade, a sequel to Trade Secret, was published by Baen in hardcover in May 2022 (ISBN 978-1-9821-2608-7).
- Because Steve Miller died in 2024, Trade Lanes is in limbo (see "Forthcoming").

==== The Agent of Change sequence ====
This is the timeline for stories in the Liaden universe. In the later novels, the story centers on Theo Waitley before becoming coincident with events involving Clan Korval and the planet Surebleak. See notes below tables.

Internal order
Local Custom
Scout's Progress
Mouse and Dragon
Conflict of Honors
Agent of Change
Carpe Diem
Plan B
I Dare
Ghost Ship
Dragon Ship
Dragon in Exile
Alliance of Equals
The Gathering Edge
Neogenesis
Accepting the Lance
Trader's Leap
Fair Trade
Salvage Right
Ribbon Dance
Diviner's Bow

Publication order
Agent of Change	Del Rey, Feb. 1988, ISBN 978-0-3453-4828-9	Ace, Oct. 2002, ISBN 978-0-4410-0991-6
Conflict of Honors	Del Rey, June 1988, ISBN 978-0-3453-5353-5	Ace, July 2002, ISBN 978-0-4410-0964-0
Carpe Diem	Del Rey, Sep. 1989, ISBN 978-0-3453-6310-7	Ace, Jan. 2003, ISBN 978-0-4410-1022-6
Plan B	Meisha Merlin, Feb. 1999, ISBN 978-1-8920-6509-4 hc, July 2007, ISBN 978-1-8920-6500-1 tpb	Ace, April 2003, ISBN 978-0-4410-1053-0
Local Custom	Included in Pilots Choice (Meisha Merlin) Feb. 2001, ISBN 978-1-8920-6511-7 hc Nov. 2004, ISBN 978-1-8920-6502-5 tpb	Ace, Jan. 2002, ISBN 978-0-4410-0911-4; Baen eBook, Feb. 2007, ISBN 978-1-6257-9426-0
Scout's Progress	Included in Pilots Choice (Meisha Merlin) Feb. 2001, ISBN 978-1-8920-6511-7 hc Nov. 2004, ISBN 978-1-8920-6502-5 tpb	Ace, Apr. 2002, ISBN 978-0-4410-0927-5; Baen eBook, Feb. 2007, ISBN 978-1-6257-9428-4
I Dare	Meisha Merlin, Feb. 2002, ISBN 978-1-8920-6512-4 hc, Sep. 2007, ISBN 978-1-8920-6503-2 tpb	Ace, July 2003, ISBN 978-0-4410-1085-1
Mouse & Dragon	Baen Books, June 2010, ISBN 978-1-4516-3759-5	
Ghost Ship	Baen Books, Aug. 2011, ISBN 978-1-4391-3455-9	
Dragon Ship	Baen Books, Sep. 2012, ISBN 978-1-4516-3798-4	
Dragon in Exile	Baen Books, June 2015, ISBN 978-1-4767-8071-9	
Alliance of Equals	Baen Books, July 2016, ISBN 978-1-4767-8148-8	
The Gathering Edge	May 2017 (Baen) ISBN 978-1-4767-8218-8	eISBN 978-1-62579-577-9 Baen eBook
Neogenesis	Jan. 2018 (Baen) ISBN 978-1-4814-8278-3	eISBN 978-1-62579-622-6 Baen eBook
Accepting the Lance	Dec. 2019 (Baen) ISBN 978-1-9821-2421-2	eISBN 978-1-62579-745-2 Baen eBook
Trader's Leap	Dec. 2020 (Baen) ISBN 978-1-9821-2501-1	eISBN 978-1-62579-799-5 Baen eBook
Fair Trade	May 2022 (Baen) ISBN 978-1-9821-2608-7	eISBN 978-1-6257-9862-6 Baen eBook
Salvage Right	July 2023 (Baen) ISBN 978-1-9821-9268-6	eISBN 978-1-6257-9862-6 Baen eBook
Ribbon Dance	June 2024 (Baen) ISBN 978-1-9821-9344-7	eISBN 978-1-6257-9965-4 Baen eBook
Diviner's Bow	April 2025 (Baen) ISBN 978-1-6680-7252-3	eISBN 978-1-9648-5605-6 Baen eBook

Liaden novels featuring Theo Waitley
Fledgling	Baen Books (September 2009) ISBN 978-1-4391-3287-6	Introduction to Theo Waitley, schoolgirl, who finds her unique qualities during off-world travel with the help of the Liaden Scouts. [Young Adult]
Saltation	Baen Books (April 2010) ISBN 978-1-4391-3452-8	Theo attends pilot academy sponsored by a Scout and, despite opposition, becomes a working Pilot with the help of allies.
Ghost Ship	Baen Books (August 2011 ) ISBN 978-1-4391-3455-9	Theo's adventures as a courier for Uncle, then with Bechimo she contracts for a trade loop with Korval, now installed on Surebleak.
Dragon Ship	Baen Books (September 2012) ISBN 978-1-4516-3798-4	Further adventures as Theo pilots Bechimo under contract to Korval. The Clan deal with Surebleak and the Department of Interior.
The Gathering Edge	Baen Books (May 2017) ISBN 978-1-4767-8218-8	All Theo, all the time, which makes Edge the direct sequel to Dragon Ship, with the action taking place concurrently with that described in Dragon in Exile and Alliance of Equals.
Neogenesis	Baen Books (January 2018) ISBN 978-1-4814-8278-3	Pulls together most of the loose threads from earlier novels, including Clan Korval, Surebleak, and Theo threads.
Accepting the Lance	Baen Books (December 2019) ISBN 978-1-9821-2421-2	Continues from Neogenesis.

==== Notes on novels ====
- Fledgling (2007), a 31-chapter serialized novel that was first seen in draft form on the authors' website, with chapters released weekly from January 2007 through October 2007. Fledgling introduces Theo Waitley and gives some of the background to her unexpected arrival at the end of I Dare. The revised version Fledgling (2009) was published in hardcover by Baen Books (September 2009 ISBN 1-4391-3287-9). The original pre-revision Fledgling can be downloaded for free from both Amazon and the Baen Free Library.
- Saltation (draft complete, January 2009), is the sequel to Fledgling, a weekly serial novel on the authors' website. Publication began on Monday, 21 January 2008. A revised version was released in hardcover by Baen Books in April 2010 ISBN 978-1-4391-3345-3.
- Ghost Ship, the sequel to Saltation, was published by Baen Books. A synopsis of Ghost Ship was published in September 2010. Ghost Ship's first draft was completed in late August 2010. It was published in hardcover on 2 August 2011 ISBN 978-1-4391-3455-9 and in paperback on 31 July 2012 ISBN 978-1-4516-3792-2.
- Dragon Ship, the sequel to Ghost Ship, was published by Baen Books in hardcover on 4 September 2012 ISBN 978-1-4516-3798-4.
- Necessity's Child, which occurs on Surebleak at the same time as Ghost Ship, was published by Baen in hardcover on 5 February 2013 ISBN 978-1-4516-3887-5, in paperback on 25 February 2014 ISBN 978-1-4767-3631-0, and in ebook on 14 January 2013 ISBN 978-1-6182-4987-6.
- Dragon in Exile was published by Baen Books in hardcover on 2 June 2015 ISBN 978-1-4767-8071-9 and ebook 15 May 2015.

==== Thirtieth Anniversary Editions ====
The (30th) Anniversary edition of the first Liaden Universe novel, Agent of Change, was published in November 2018 as a mass-market paperback.

The (30th) Anniversary edition of the second Liaden Universe novel, Conflict of Honors, was published in October 2019 as a mass-market paperback.

The (30th) Anniversary edition of the third Liaden Universe novel, Carpe Diem, was published in November 2020 as a mass-market paperback.

==== Forthcoming ====
The latest book to be published is the Clan Korval/Redlands novel Diviner's Bow, a direct sequel to Ribbon Dance. It was published in April 2025.

Following Fair Trade, a fourth Jethri Gobelyn novel (Trade Lanes) was in the works at the time of Steve Miller's death.

==== Omnibus volumes ====
===== Pre-Baen =====
- Partners in Necessity (Feb. 2000, ISBN 978-1-8920-6510-0 hardcover, ISBN 978-1-8920-6501-8 trade paperback)
  - Contains Conflict of Honors, Agent of Change, and Carpe Diem
- Pilots Choice (Feb. 2001, ISBN 978-1-8920-6511-7 hardcover; November 2004, ISBN 978-1-8920-6502-5 trade paperback)
  - Contains Local Custom and Scout's Progress

===== Baen e-book only =====
These were released immediately upon Lee and Miller's coming to Baen in the wake of Meisha Merlin's dissolution, to bring the ebooks back into print and begin earning royalties for Lee and Miller (who had not been paid by Meisha Merlin). For new readers, the subsequent Baen omnibus editions (below) provide the same books at a lower cost.

- Korval's Legacy Collection (Baen ebook bundle)
  - Contains Conflict of Honors, Agent of Change, Carpe Diem, Plan B, and Local Custom
- Phase Change Collection (Baen ebook bundle)
  - Contains Scout's Progress, I Dare, Crystal Soldier, Crystal Dragon, and Balance of Trade

Additionally, Agent of Change and Fledgling are available at no cost in the Baen Free Library

===== Baen print and e-book =====
- The Dragon Variation (Jun. 2010, ISBN 1-4391-3369-7 trade paperback)
  - Contains Local Custom, Scout's Progress, and Conflict of Honors
- The Agent Gambit (Jan. 2011, ISBN 1-4391-3407-3 trade paperback)
  - Contains Agent of Change and Carpe Diem
- Korval's Game (May 2011, ISBN 1-4391-3439-1 trade paperback)
  - Contains Plan B and I Dare
- The Crystal Variation (Sep. 2011, ISBN 978-1-4391-3463-4 trade paperback)
  - Contains Crystal Soldier, Crystal Dragon, and Balance of Trade

Audiobooks

A number of novels have currently available audiobook editions:

- Accepting the Lance
- The Tomorrow Log
- Neogenesis
- The Gathering Edge
- Alliance of Equals
- Dragon Ship
- Necessity's Child
- Ghost Ship
- Saltation
- Fledgling
- Mouse & Dragon
- Scout's Progress
- Local Custom
- Balance of Trade
- Crystal Soldier
- Dragon in Exile
- I Dare
- Plan B
- Carpe Diem
- Conflict of Honors
- Crystal Dragon
- Agent of Change

=== Short stories ===
These also include stories about Lute and Moonhawk, the earlier incarnations of two major characters in the books. Some short stories also are being made available for free either in the Baen Free Library or at Splinter Universe.

==== Current collections ====
On 2 April 2012, Lee and Miller announced that Baen had purchased publication rights for the contents of Chapbooks #1 through #17 (Two Tales of Korval through Skyblaze), which would be reissued in multiple volumes.

The first volume, Liaden Universe Constellation Volume I, was published by Baen for July 2013 in trade paperback and ebook formats. The second volume was published by Baen in January 2014. The third volume was published by Baen in August 2015. The fourth volume was published by Baen in June 2019.

Baen has collected the chapbooks and other short stories in five volumes:

1. A Liaden Universe Constellation Volume 1 (2013, ISBN 978-1-4516-3923-0 trade paperback, ISBN 978-1-62579-136-8 eBook)
2. A Liaden Universe Constellation Volume 2 (2014, ISBN 978-1-4516-3944-5 trade paperback, ISBN 978-1-62579-222-8 eBook)
3. A Liaden Universe Constellation Volume 3 (2015, ISBN 978-1-47678-068-9 trade paperback, ISBN 978-1-62579-717-9 eBook)
4. A Liaden Universe Constellation Volume 4 (4 June 2019, ISBN 978-1-4814-8404-6 trade paperback, ISBN 978-1-4814-8404-6 eBook)
5. A Liaden Universe Constellation Volume 5 (1 February 2022, ISBN 978-1-982125-90-5 trade paperback, ISBN 978-1-62579-853-4 eBook)

==== Out of print collections ====
The chapbooks have been collected in two compilations:

1. Liaden Universe Companion Volume One (2005, ISBN 0-9722473-8-6 hardcover, ISBN 0-9722473-9-4 trade paperback)
2. Liaden Universe Companion Volume Two (2007, ISBN 978-0-9776639-5-8 hardcover, ISBN 978-0-9776639-6-5 soft cover)

These stories are also being published by Baen webscriptions as the Liaden Universe Big Bang, consisting of Liaden Unibus I and Liaden Unibus II. This includes the first 12 Liaden Universe chapbooks. It does not include the chapbook Calamity's Child (containing Liaden story Sweet Waters and non-Liaden A Night At the Opera), or the non-Liaden chapbooks The Naming of Kinzel and Master Walk.

Selected chapbooks are now being published by SRM Publisher (using the imprint Pinbeam Books) in the Amazon Kindle, Angus & Robertson, Apple, Baen, Barnes and Noble Nook, Google Play, Indigo, Rakuten Kobo, Scribd, Mondadori, and Thalia ebook stores. In these stores, they are sold without DRM. See below for availability.

=== Table of Liaden Universe short stories and novelettes ===
Summaries, first publication and chapbook, and collections.
Title	Summary	Published in	Baen Liaden Universe Constellation
To Cut an Edge	Val Con meets Edger.	Two Tales of Korval (#1) (Note: Collected in Baen Liaden Unibus I) (Note: Collected in SRM Liaden Universe Companion 1)	Volume 1
A Day at the Races	Shan and Val Con outrage Aunt Kareen.	Two Tales of Korval (#1)	Volume 1
Where the Goddess Sends	The first tale of Lute and Moonhawk.	Fellow Travellers (#2)	Volume 1
A Spell for the Lost	The second tale of Lute and Moonhawk.	Fellow Travellers (#2)	Volume 1
Moonphase	The 55th tale of Lute and Moonhawk.	Fellow Travellers (#2)	Volume 1
Pilot of Korval	Daav and Er Thom must take up their responsibilities.	Duty Bound (#3)	Volume 1
Breath's Duty	Daav must take up a painful task.	Duty Bound (#3)	Volume 1
The Wine of Memory	Lute and Moonhawk must save an old friend.	Certain Symmetry (#4)	Volume 1
Certain Symmetry	Pat Rin must execute a friend's will — at considerable risk to himself.	Certain Symmetry (#4)	Volume 1
Balance of Trade	(expanded into the novel of the same name)	Trading in Futures (#5)	Volume 1
A Choice of Weapons	Daav has a bad time at a party.	Trading in Futures (#5)	Volume 1
The King of the Cats	(non-canon, cross-over with other stories by Steve Miller)	The Cat's Job	Volume 3
Changeling	How Ren Zel became a pilot and what befell him thereafter.	Absolute Magnitude #14 and Changeling (#6) (Note: Collected in SRM Liaden Universe Companion 2)	Volume 1
A Matter of Dreams	The oft-disappointed crew of an itinerant spaceship find that magic and dreams can come face to face with the reality of money and power — and that power abhors an honest confrontation; meanwhile, the young Moonhawk begins her spiral of trouble.	Loose Cannon (#7) (Note: Collected in Baen Liaden Unibus II)	Volume 1
Phoenix	Artists and the abandoned must struggle to survive in the impoverished outskirts of Liad's greatest spaceport.	Loose Cannon (#7)	Volume 1
Heirloom	Pat Rin must play a perfect game — without rules.	Shadows and Shades (#8)	Volume 1
Naratha's Shadow	A Scout must control an ancient artifact.	Shadows and Shades (#8)	Volume 1
Sweet Waters	A Liaden Scout is stranded when his ship breaks down.	Calamity's Child|	Volume 1
Quiet Knives	The tale of Captain Rolanni (mentioned in Carpe Diem), called upon to answer a promise she made years and worlds ago.	Quiet Knives (#9)	Volume 2
Veil of the Dancer	The story of a brilliant young girl, her doting father, and the gift that proved to be so much more informative — and dangerous — than either of them had anticipated	Quiet Knives (#9)	Volume 2
Lord of the Dance	Pat Rin hosts a dance on Surebleak for his subjects as Boss and his Korval family, with surprises in store for everyone — not least of all, Pat Rin himself.	With Stars Underfoot (#10)	Volume 2
This House	A retired Healer is presented with his most challenging case: a young lady who only he might be able to help — who also happens to be his ex-lover's new lover.	With Stars Underfoot (#10)	Volume 2
The Beggar King	Young Daav yos'Phelium and a Juntavas boss work together to solve a mystery of disappearing pilots in the Low Port.	Necessary Evils (#11)	Volume 2
Necessary Evils	In the time of the Crystal Soldier and Crystal Dragon prequels, a meeting between an enslaved scientist and genetically engineered indentured workers may mean freedom for both.	Necessary Evils (#11)	Volume 2
Prodigal Son	Val Con returns to Vandar, the primitive world where he and Miri lived for a while, to tidy up one last loose end with the Department of the Interior. Set during, and partly incorporated into, Ghost Ship.	Allies (#12)	Volume 2
Fighting Chance	The story of the young Miri Robertson's last days on Surebleak.	Allies (#12)	Volume 2
Daughter of Dragons	A tale of some of Lady Kareen yos'Phelium's struggles during the inception of Plan B.	Dragon Tide (#13)	Volume 2
Dragon Tide	Set in the pre-Korval Crystal Soldier and Crystal Dragon universe.	Dragon Tide (#13)	Volume 2
Persistence	Occurs between Pat Rin having the ring from the Dept. of Interior and his arrival on Surebleak.	Eidolon (#14)	Volume 2
Shadow Partner	Occurs just before A Day at the Races.	Eidolon (#14)	Volume 2
Misfits	The story of the Weatherman and what became of him.	Misfits (#15)	Volume 2
Hidden Resources	Occurs at Korval's hidey-hole for the children and elders during the first part of Ghost Ship.	Halfling Moon (#16)	Volume 2
Moon on the Hills	Occurs on Surebleak during the first part of Ghost Ship.	Halfling Moon (#16)	Volume 2
Skyblaze	A taxi driver with interesting past ties to Korval finds a new future on Korval-dominated Surebleak.	Skyblaze (#17)	Volume 2
Kin Ties	The last of Clan Jabun meets Ren Zel.	Courier Run (#18)	Volume 3
Guaranteed Delivery	The Ride the Luck makes a special delivery.	Courier Run (#18)	Volume 3
Intelligent Design	Val Con and Shan find Jeeves.	Legacy Systems (#19)	Volume 3
The Space at Tinsori Light	After a jump gone wrong, a pilot of Clan Korval finds himself at a most unusual aid station in the middle of nowhere — literally.	Legacy Systems (#19)	Volume 3
Moon's Honor	As a faction of renegade priestesses seeks to circumvent the Dyan City High Priestess to outlaw "hedge magicians," Moonhawk meets Lute for the first time.	Moon's Honor (#20)	Volume 3
Landed Alien	Kara ven'Arith finds life after graduation from Eylot Pilot Academy complicated.	www.baen.com and Technical Details (#21)	Volume 3
Eleutherios	The friars at a down-and-out abbey are taken in hand by an unlikely savior.	www.baen.com and Technical Details (#21)	Volume 3
Chimera	Two novelettes set on Surebleak after it has been invaded and conquered by Pat Rin yos'Phelium Clan Korval.	Sleeping with the Enemy (#22)	No
Friend of a Friend	Two novelettes set on Surebleak after it has been invaded and conquered by Pat Rin yos'Phelium Clan Korval.	Sleeping with the Enemy (#22)	Volume 4
Street Cred	Two stories dealing with the complications arising from decisive change and decisive Change Management at the point of peril. Wise Child reprinted from Baen.com.	Change Management (#23)	Volume 4
Wise Child	Two stories dealing with the complications arising from decisive change and decisive Change Management at the point of peril. Wise Child reprinted from Baen.com.	Change Management (#23)	No
Due Diligence	Cornered in a cheap bar by a too-knowledgeable stranger with an unlikely offer, Fer Gun realized having no money and no license might be the least of his troubles.	Due Diligence (#24)	Volume 4
Out of True	In the time of Balance of Trade, an itinerant freighter crew discovers that norbears can be good company.	www.baen.com and Cultivar (#25)	Volume 3
The Rifle's First Wife	Former Yxtrang soldier Diglon Rifle and Scout Alara chel'Voyon discover that sometimes two problems solve each other.	Splinter Universe and Cultivar (#25)	Volume 3
Roving Gambler	Quin yos'Phelium makes a new friend.	Splinter Universe and Heirs to Trouble (#26)	Volume 3
Code of Honor	When a young mercenary soldier is recalled home to Liad, he finds he must choose between the honor of the mercs and the honor of his Clan.	Splinter Universe and Heirs to Trouble (#26)	Volume 3
Degrees of Separation	A small tale of lives in progress, plans made and altered — and altered again. A tale of bread, luck, love...and Lowport.	Degrees of Separation (#27)	Volume 4
Cutting Corners	Not having a proper mechanic on-board: just one more way that the line cut corners and saved itself, so the story went, a goodly amount of money.	www.baen.com	Volume 4
Block Party	A story of orphans, neighbors, and warm pastry with hot tea. Follows on from Degrees of Separation.	www.baen.com	Volume 4
Excerpts from Two Lives	Two people seek to restore lost glory to their nation using poorly understood old technology.	Star Destroyers and Bad Actors (#33)	Volume 4
Revolutionists	One man's insurgent is another man's freedom fighter.	Razor's Edge and Bad Actors (#33)	Volume 4
Fortune's Favors	Mar Tyn's Luck has recently cost him his home and his savings. He has only one thing left to gamble — and his life might not be enough.	Fortune's Favors (#28)	Volume 5
Opportunity to Seize	Daav and Aelliana catch up with Kamele.	Fortune's Favors (#28)	Volume 5
Shout of Honor	Commander Vepal is a Hero. He is also the Yxtrang ambassador to the greater universe. These two facts do not make Vepal's life easy — but they do make it interesting.	Shout of Honor (#29)	Volume 5
The Gate that Locks the Tree: A Minor Melant'i Play for Snow Season	An original novella first published in February 2020; it takes place on a snowy Surebleak and involves new as well as a number of long-known Liaden characters.	The Gate that Locks the Tree (#30)	Volume 5
A Visit to the Galaxy Ballroom	Scout Lina yo'Bingim arrives on Surebleak and discovers why the Surebleak Scouts, led by Clonak ter'Meulen, have split from the Liaden Scouts.	Ambient Conditions (#31)	Volume 5
Ambient Conditions	Details a dark time in Liaden history.	Ambient Conditions (#31)	Volume 5
Command Decision	A Liaden story set some time before Agent of Change begins. Originally published in Release the Virgins	Change State (#32)	Volume 5
Dead Men Dream	Set in the time of Jethri Gobelyn.	Change State (#32)	Volume 5
Dark Secrets	A Terran-Liaden team running a small ship battle pirates, thus putting the station itself in danger.	Infinite Stars: Dark Frontiers and Bad Actors (#33)	Volume 5
Preferred Seating	How Can Ith yos'Phelium was lost by Korval and found Isfelm.	www.baen.com	Volume 5
Our Lady of Benevolence	A story about rebuilding after the fallout of Skyblaze.	Bread Alone (#34)	No
Our Lady of Benevolence	Bread Alone includes: Degrees of Separation, Block Party, and Fortune's Favors.	Bread Alone (#34)	No
Standing Orders	What happens at the end of a war that no one really won, where victory came at the price of acting more like the enemy than the High Command ever should?	Derelict (Zombies Need Brains) and From Every Storm (#35)	No
From Every Storm a Rainbow	Sinit Caylon is challenged by the state of Clan Mizel.	www.baen.com and From Every Storm (#35)	No
Songs of the Fathers	Lomar Fasholt and her family struggle to follow her Mother's religion.	From Every Storm (#35)	No
Gadreel's Folly	Kasagaria Mikelsyn's origin story.	Chicks in Tank Tops (Baen Books)	No
Last Train To Clarksville	A space western, where Meld and Questa are on the wrong side of the law.	Last Train Outta Kepler-283c (Baen Books)	No

== Factions ==
The Liaden universe features both human and non-human races. The human race is divided into Terrans, Liaden, and Yxtrang. Non-human races include Clutch Turtles, Cats, Norbears, and Ssussdriads.

=== Liaden ===
Liadens are a race from a planet called Liad. Liadens are usually shorter than Terrans and often have golden skin. They are deeply concerned with their melant'i, which roughly corresponds to the concern with "face" associated with Japanese samurai. Some Liadens have xenophobic or isolationist views and will refer to individuals of other races as "it," comparing them to animals. They often dislike those with Terran blood.

Liaden society is clan-based, with each clan made up of one or more families or lines. The Head of a Clan is called the "Delm," and the head of a line is the "Thodelm." These positions can be held by males or females.

Liaden clans do not generally allow lifelong mating. Instead, Liadens practice contract marriages, where two individuals from different clans are ordered or allowed by their Delms to create a progeny for one of the two clans. This marriage is over when the terms of the contract are fulfilled. Most clan members must produce at least one progeny to replace them.

"Lifemating" is when two individuals become exclusively bound to one another. This can happen by order of a Delm (a rare occurrence) or the physical, emotional, and spiritual bonding of two individuals with "dramliza" abilities.

Some Liaden are trained as explorers. The "Liaden Scouts," who feature prominently in the series, are regarded with distaste by the more isolationist members of Liaden society.

Most of the stories in the Liaden Universe center on members of Clan Korval, which is made up of the yos'Phelium and yos'Galan lines.

Korval

- Val Con yos'Phelium: Delm, ex-Scout, lifemate to Miri
- Shan yos'Galan: Master Trader, foster-brother to Val Con; lifemate of Priscilla Delacroix y Mendoza; (current incarnation of Lute)
- Daav yos'Phelium: ex-Delm, ex-Scout, father to Val Con and Theo Waitley
  - Jen Sar Kiladi: Daav's alter ego, a professor of Cultural Genetics at Delgado University. Jen Sar was the onagrata of Kamele Waitley.
- Aelliana Caylon: Lifemate to Daav, mother to Val Con
- Er Thom yos'Galan: Master Trader, lifemate of Anne Davis, father to Shan, Nova, and Anthora
- Pat Rin yos'Phelium: cousin to Val Con
- Kareen yos'Phelium: sister to Daav, mother to Pat Rin, expert on "The Code of proper conduct"
- Anthora yos'Galan: sister to Shan and Nova, with preternatural (Dramliza) abilities
- Ren Zel dea'Judan: Lifemate to Anthora, with preternatural (Dramliza) abilities
- Nova yos'Galan: sister to Shan, Anthora and Val Con
- Luken bel'Tarda: cousin, rug dealer, foster father of Pat Rin.
- Children and younger members (in no particular order): Quinn, Padi, Syl Vor; Mik and Shindi; and Talizea.
- Jen Sin yos'Phelium: Chief Light Keeper at Tinsori Light. Thought to have died two hundred years ago, but was "merely temporarily misplaced."

Others

- Jan Rek ter'Astin: Scout Captain, friend of Jethri Gobelyn
- Clonak ter'Meulen: Scout, friend of Daav and Val Con
- Shadia ne'Zame: Scout, friend of Clonak
- Win Ton yo'Vala: Scout, friend of Theo Waitley and Less Pilot of Bechimo
- Kara ven'Arith: Crew of Bechimo
- Vertu dea'San: Taxi driver originally from Liad, subsequently exiled to Surebleak. Significant other to Cheever McFarland.

=== Terran ===
Terrans are named for their home planet, Terra. It is implied in the series that Terra is Earth. Based on the description of the Liaden people as a younger race, it is also implied that Terrans predated the Liadens' arrival in the series' universe. Most Terrans resent that the "younger" races, such as the Liadens, hold more power in the realm of shipping and commerce.

Among the Terrans, the Juntavas are an organized crime "clan" who play various roles in the series as antagonists or allies of the main Liaden characters. Unlike the real-world mafia, the Juntavas act as an unopposed, organized government and have appointed officials, called Sector Judges, who administer justice within their jurisdictions.

A number of other planets are known to have non-Liaden human inhabitants, presumably of Terran descent. Some of these worlds, such as Surebleak and Delgado, were settled by Terrans. Other worlds, such as Sintia, were settled by ships from Crystal Dragon-era colonization waves.

Some Terran colony worlds, such as Vandar, have regressed to pre-spaceflight technology levels. To allow these societies to develop without interference, external contact is forbidden. However, as of Prodigal Son, which takes place after I Dare, there are signs that this policy may be changing.

Gobelyns

- Jethri Gobelyn: apprentice trader, apprenticed to Norn ven'Deelin
- Iza Gobelyn: Captain of Gobelyn's Market; mother to Cris, Seeli, and Jethri
- Arin Gobelyn: deceased, husband to Iza, father to Jethri, related to Uncle
- Cris Gobelyn: first mate of Gobelyn's Market, Iza's eldest child
- Dyk Gobelyn: junior on Gobelyn's Market, cook
- Khatelane Gobelyn: pilot on Gobelyn's Market
- Mel Gobelyn: on Gobelyn's Market
- Paitor Gobelyn: trader on Gobelyn's Market, brother to Iza
- Seeli Gobelyn: admin on Gobelyn's Market, Iza's second child
- Zam Gobelyn: on Gobelyn's Market
- Grig Tomas: back-up everything on Gobelyn's Market, Arin's cousin, related to Uncle

Korval clan members

- Anne Davis: Lifemate to Er Thom, mother to Shan, master linguist and musician
- Priscilla Delacroix y Mendoza: Lifemate to Shan (current incarnation of Moonhawk)
- Miri Robertson: half-Liaden in Mercenary Retired, Bodyguard Retired, Have Weapon Will Travel; lifemate to Val Con and joint Delm (Delmae)
- Inas Bhar: Juntavas Sector Judge Natesa the Assassin, lifemate of Pat Rin
- Gordy Arbuthnot: cabin boy in Dutiful Passage. Shan's cousin via the Davis side of the family.

Korval-linked

- Theo Waitley: recently discovered daughter to Daav yos'Phelium; acknowledged in Ghost Ship as blood kin to Korval but not seen as a clan member
- Kamele Waitley: Theo's mother and professor at Delgado University. Da'av was Kamele's Onagrata using the name Jen Sar Kiladi after Aelliana's murder.
- Cheever McFarland: Master Pilot, messenger to Korval, then Pat Rin's bodyguard/chief of security
- Clarence o'Berin: Juntavas Boss on Liad; after retirement sat Second on Bechimo
- Tollance Berik-Jones aka Tolly aka 1362: a mentor, who ensures that AIs are brought into awareness well socialized. Attached to Tocohl's mission.

Uncle-linked

- (The) Uncle (aka Yuri Tomas): a serially reborn meddler with a finger in everybody's pies, while at any one time tending a half-dozen certain-to-be-unsettling projects of his own. Uncle remembers the old universe. Has ties to Cantra and to some crew members of Gobelyn's Market.
  - Note: Technically Uncle isn't a Terran, because he predates Terra.
- Seignur Veeoni: one of Uncle's clones; working on making modern-day fractins at an undisclosed location
- Dulsey Omron: Uncle's long-time companion and assistant
- Grig (Grigory) Tomas: see Gobelyns.
- Raisy (Raisana) Thomas: Grig's older twin sister

Others

- Hakan Meltz: Val Con and Miri's musical friend on Vandar
- Estra Trelu: person Val Con and Miri stayed with on Vandar
- Athna Brigsbee: Vandar busybody
- Kem Darmill: Hakan Meltz' girlfriend and later wife (by the time of Prodigal Son)
- various Juntavas
- various people on Surebleak
- various people on Vandar

=== Independent AIs ===
- Jeeves: planetary security AI repurposed as butler to yos'Galen at Trealla Fantrol, but transferred to Jelaza Kazone upon Korval's relocation to Surebleak.
- Tocohl Lorlin (Daughter of Korval): Jeeves' daughter. Currently in control of Tinsori Light.
- Bechimo: a "sentient and sapient" spaceship, built long ago as a "long-loop trader," incorporating "old tech." Win Ton yo'Vala rediscovered him. Theo Waitley became his Captain.
- Admiral Bunter: originally a composite AI, made up of seven semiderelict ships (with thirteen old and cramped computers between them) out of the junkyard at Jemiatha's Jumble Stop. Admiral Bunter is Theo's Fault. It guarded Jamiatha's Jumble Stop Station from pirates for a time; it was later transferred to another "cranium" and ship by Mentor Tolly Jones, Tocol Lorin, and Inkirani Yo (another mentor), and has since become a "free ship," no longer associated with Jamiatha's Jumble Stop.
- Disian: a "free ship" mentored by Tolly Jones.

=== Yxtrang ===
The Yxtrang are typically much larger than their Terran counterparts and are regarded as a warlike, conquest-driven people. Their home planet is unknown.

References in Crystal Soldier and Crystal Dragon suggest that the Yxtrang are the descendants of a group of "X Strain" and "Y Strain," genetically engineered soldiers who served in a platoon with Jela and accompanied the human migration to the new universe. Some of them venerate Jela (an "M Strain") for his skills and deeds as a warrior.

It is not known whether they can interbreed with Liadens or Terrans.

- Nelirikk: ex-Explorer (equivalent to Scout), subsequently sworn to Line yos'Phelium; becomes Miri's bodyguard; aka "Beautiful"
- Hazenthull Explorer: junior Explorer, subsequently sworn to Line yos'Phelium
- Diglon Rifle: enlisted soldier attached to Hazenthull, subsequently sworn to Line yos'Phelium.
- Commander Vepal: Yxtrang roving ambassador
  - Pilot Erthax: member of Vepal's Small Troop
  - Ochin Rifle: member of Vepal's Small Troop

=== Clutch Turtles ===
These non-humans are even larger than Yxtrang and are very long-lived. They resemble turtles who walk upright. The length of their names is directly proportional to their age and accomplishments. They are usually slow to act but are very dangerous when angered and can move quickly when needed.

Clutch Turtles travel in starships made from hollowed-out asteroids, using an electron substitution drive that can have hallucinogenic effects on the human nervous system. Both a "low drive" and "high drive" exist; usually, the clutch turtles use the slower low drive, but use the considerably faster high drive in I Dare.

Clutch Turtles can command forces with great destructive or healing potential by singing. The Yxtrang greatly feared and avoided them because they suffered a resounding defeat in battle many years before.

The Clutch Turtles encountered in the Agent of Change sequence are a "market research" team working on behalf of their clan, which is known for manufacturing crystalline blades of extreme sharpness and durability by growing them in caves over decades.

- Edger
- Sheather
- Watcher
- Selector
- Handler

=== Cats ===
Many cats appear in the stories, usually by name, and often taking an active part in the proceedings. Unlike ordinary house cats, these cats often display paranormal abilities as well as considerable intelligence.

- Flinx: at Tarnia's Clanhouse
- Lord Merlin: Anthora's cat, very active in I Dare
- Patch: Binjali Repair Shop's resident cat and "co-owner"
- Lady Dignity: Daav yos'Phelium's answer to his sister's complaint that he has no dignity
- Relchin: an orange-and-white cat who "enjoys the outdoors" also resides with Daav yos'Phelium
- Silk: Pat Rin's mouser and majordomo on Surebleak
- Charzi: lives in the Lysta Clanhouse in Misfits
- Coyster: Jen Sar Kiladi's cat, attached to Theo Waitley on Delgado in Fledgling
- Mandrin: Jen Sar Kiladi's black and white on Delgado

=== Norbears ===
Norbears are furry, quadrupedal herbivorous mammals with a burrowing habit and soft, dense coats. They range in height from 16–22 cm and weigh between 121–180 g. Norbears' coloration ranges, including grey, brown, black, orange, and white, sometimes as mixed patterns. They have a fearless and lively disposition and are naturally empathic. Norbears adapt well to domestication but are banned on certain worlds.

- Master Frodo aboard the Dutiful Passage in Conflict of Honors
- Hevelin (named after long-time science fiction fan Rusty Hevelin)
- Podesta: Hevelin's great-granddaughter

=== Trees (Ssussdriads) ===
The Ssussdriads are a race of wise, sentient trees. Jelaza Kazone is a prominent member of this race. It is a very large tree that lives on the grounds of Clan Korval's primary residence, often communicating its likes and dislikes to senior members of the clan. It has a particular interest in the future children of the clan.

As a young soldier, Jela found Jelaza Kazone on a desert planet where his ship had crashed. Though barely a seedling and the last member of a dying race, the tree was by itself able to repel the Sheriekas' invasion of the planet. As an act of trust, the tree gave its only seed pod to feed the starving Jela. When Jela's rescue came, he refused to leave the tree behind.

The tree proved intelligent and able to communicate via mental images. It also had the ability to manipulate the chemistry of its seed pods to create useful pharmaceutical compounds. Both these powers proved useful as Jela and Cantra searched for information necessary for mankind to escape its collapsing universe.

The name Jelaza Kazone (variously translated as "Jela's Promise," "Jela's Contract," or "Jela's Dream") refers to the promise Cantra yos'Phelium made to Jela — who knew he was destined to die before the completion of the migration — to see the tree through to safety on the new human homeworld. Clan Korval holds itself the guardian of this promise in perpetuity, and every trading vessel of Korval carries a seed of the tree somewhere on board to ensure the survival of its race.

==== Individual trees ====
- The Tree at Erob's Clan house on Lytaxin — mentioned in Plan B
- A seedling installed on Cantra's ship at the end of Crystal Dragon. This sapling was recovered alive and well in Neogenesis.
- A sapling planted on Yulie Sharper's freeholding
- Two saplings planted on yos'Galan's island on SureBleak planet

== Concepts ==
=== Melant'i ===
Much of Liaden culture centers on a concept called melant'i. This is roughly analogous to personal honor or good manners: a person of impeccable melant'i will behave in a certain way in a given situation. It is also used to distinguish between a person's different roles in life, dictating behavior etiquette in different situations, similar to code-switching.

=== Bows and modes of speech ===
==== High and Low Liaden ====
The High Liaden language is used for all formal conversations between people, reflecting the exact melant'i and roles of the two individuals.

For example, a sentence might be in the role of Master Pilot to Student Pilot. In contrast, another sentence might be Parent to Child, or Adult to Adult, or Adult to your Delm (clan leader), or Adult to another clan’s Delm. The forms are symmetrical and directional, with Master Pilot to Student Pilot being a different mode than Student Pilot to Master Pilot. With High Liaden, you can always tell the roles that the speaker intends for the listener to interpret what is being said.

Low Liaden is reserved for informal family conversations.

==== Liaden bows ====
Bows are used by Liadens when both meeting and parting, reflecting the exact melant'i and roles of the two individuals. Bows are precise and complicated.

=== Space travel ===
==== Jump drive ====
Human ships can travel quickly between planets by "jumping." Different jumping technologies exist but are all fairly fast. Only the Clutch Turtles use a different method of space travel.

Propulsion and artificial gravity are provided by Struven Surface Units, which Theo describes as having a "sense of presence." The sealed unit is the source of gravity that the ship generates and "the source of the Struven Surface that the engines then amplified and tuned, building fields that allow the ship to interact with the lattice crystal of space-time and to move...elsewhere."

From The Gathering Edge:

A ship in the Jump configuration preferred by most starfaring groups neither comes nor goes. If the Jump is not calculated properly, the ship stays where it is within the frame of previous motions. If the Jump is calculated exactly, the ship's energy and contents become one, contracting dimensionally, and the ship and its force packet vibrate their way into a crystalline state that adjusts space around it. The goal is to achieve an energy level meant to match that of a "place"—a star system, a nebula, a rendezvous point—where the matched energy levels permit the ship to reappear in normal space. Transferring from place to place in this way requires minimal energy once the Struven units stress the base ship-and-energy packet into a unit; space rearranges itself around the packet until the ship emerges—or occasionally fails to emerge—at the target location.

— Advanced Space Travel for Dummies, 17th ed.

==== Ships ====
Ships range from single-person courier, small trade craft, private ships, long-loop, and family trade ships (depreciated in modern shipping) to large trade ships (often carrying a Master Trader), bulk cargo ships, and large passenger liners.

In the series' era of relative peace, there is little mention of purpose-built military ships, except for the battleships of the warlike Yxtrang (though mercenary companies have troop ships and various support ships). Planetary governments may have small fleets of fighter craft for defensive purposes. It is not uncommon for merchant ships to carry weaponry to defend themselves from pirates and brigands. Some large trade ships, such as Korval's Dutiful Passage, have incorporated enough weaponry to be considered full battleships.

==== Pilots and piloting ====
Pilots are shown deference in the Liaden Universe, both in Terran and Liaden space. This is due to respect and/or fear of the pilots' capabilities and their importance to the lifeblood of trade and commerce for planetary society. "Pilot" is an honorific title.

Pilots must have superior reflexes, coordination, and spatial orientation. They also need proficiency in higher mathematics to quickly and accurately solve equations in trajectory, orbital mechanics, and jump coordinates. Pilots also need to be able to defend themselves and are thus trained in self-defense and personal weaponry.

Pilots are responsible for the ship and passengers, while Co-Pilots are responsible for the Pilot and ship. Pilots operate the ship from a primary control board, where they "sit First." The Co-Pilot, or acting Co-Pilot, "sit Second." Larger ships may have other crew such as a communications officer, executive officer, and more.

Many, if not most, Pilots belong to the Pilots Guild. The Guild takes 3% of the Pilot's income for life and provides many important services in return. These services include Guild certification (required on many ships and lines), legal services and bail bonds, mailboxes with forwarding, hiring and personnel services, and recordkeeping. In larger localities, Guilds operate a Guild Hall with lounges, bars, and/or cafes. Each Guild Hall has a Guild Master.

The Guild certified Pilot Classes:

- 3rd Class: base level, qualified to work within system and orbit, operating ships not above Class B
- 2nd Class: mid-level, qualified to lift any ship to Class AA within a system and orbit
- 1st Class: a.k.a., Jump Pilot, qualified to fly interplanetary space via Jump hyperspace technology
- Master: one able to perform all aspects of piloting with excellence. This grade may undertake to train and test any of the lower three levels.

First Class Jump Pilots are awarded and wear a Pilot's leather jacket. This heavy-duty garment, with many internal pockets, is both a sign of rank and protection against weather. Only Jump Pilots wear a Pilot's jacket. Although this is not a law, it is enforced through social pressure.

In I Dare, Pat Rin is given a rating of "1st Class S," S for "small," until the Pilot has enough flight time logged on the larger ships.

Master Pilots may train and certify other Pilots. All Liaden Scout Pilots are Master Class. A Pilot in training will be granted "provisional" status in grade as the student advances.

== Awards and recognition ==
Year	Organization	Award title, Category	Work	Result	Refs
2002	Romantic Times	Romantic Times Book Club Reviewers Choice Award for Best Science Fiction Novel	Scout's Progress	Won	
2002	Fantasy, Futuristic and Paranormal (FF&P) Chapter of the Romance Writers of America	Prism Award	Scout's Progress	Won	
2002	Fantasy, Futuristic and Paranormal (FF&P) Chapter of the Romance Writers of America	Prism Award	Local Custom	Nominated	
2005	Golden Duck Award	Hal Clement Award	Balance of Trade	Won	
2008	Association of Science Fiction and Fantasy Artists	Chesley Awards - Best Cover Illustration – Paperback Book	Donato Giancola, Crystal Dragon	Won	
2010	Golden Duck Award	Hal Clement Award	Fledgeling	Nominated	
2011	SF Site	SF Site Reader's Poll	Saltation	Nominated	
2012	SF Site	SF Site Reader's Poll	Ghost Ship	Won	
2013	SF Site	SF Site Reader's Poll	Dragon Ship	Won	
2014	Locus	Locus Award, Science Fiction Novel	Necessity's Child	Nominated	
2014	Locus	Locus Award, Science Fiction Novel	Trade Secret	Nominated	

== Fan fiction ==
Lee and Miller strongly oppose fan fiction set in the Liaden universe, with Sharon Lee stating on her website, "We built our universes, and our characters; they are our intellectual property; and they are not toys lying about some virtual sandbox for other kids to pick up and modify at their whim. Steve and I do not sanction fanfic written in our universes; any such work that exists, exists without our permission, and certainly without our support."
