= RavenCon =

Science fiction convention held in Richmond, VA, USA

- Status: Active
- Genre: Multigenre
- Venue: Virginia Crossings Hotel and Convention Center
- Locations: Richmond, Virginia
- Country: United States
- Inaugurated: 2006
- Organizer: Michael Pederson
- Website: www.ravencon.com

RavenCon is an annual American science fiction convention founded in 2006 and held in Richmond, Virginia. The name RavenCon was chosen as a tribute to author Edgar Allan Poe, who lived in Richmond for a time. The convention runs over 300 hours of programming and activities featuring authors and panelists across genres, including horror, sci-fi, fantasy, military fiction, and other areas of fan cultures.

== The Webster Award ==
In 2018, RavenCon launched The Clarence Howard “Bud” Webster Award in memory of friend of the convention, Bud Webster, who died in 2016. The award is to recognize outstanding achievements in writing by Virginia writers.

=== Past winners ===
- 2019 Chris Kennedy for The Golden Horde
- 2020 Cass Morris for From Unseen Fire
- 2022 R.S. Belcher for The Ghost Dance Judgement
- 2023 R.R. Virdi for The First Binding
- 2024 Chris Semtner for Haunting Poe: Edgar Allan Poe's Afterlife in Richmond and Beyond
- 2025 Nicole Glover for The Improvisers

== Scheduled events ==
=== Programming ===
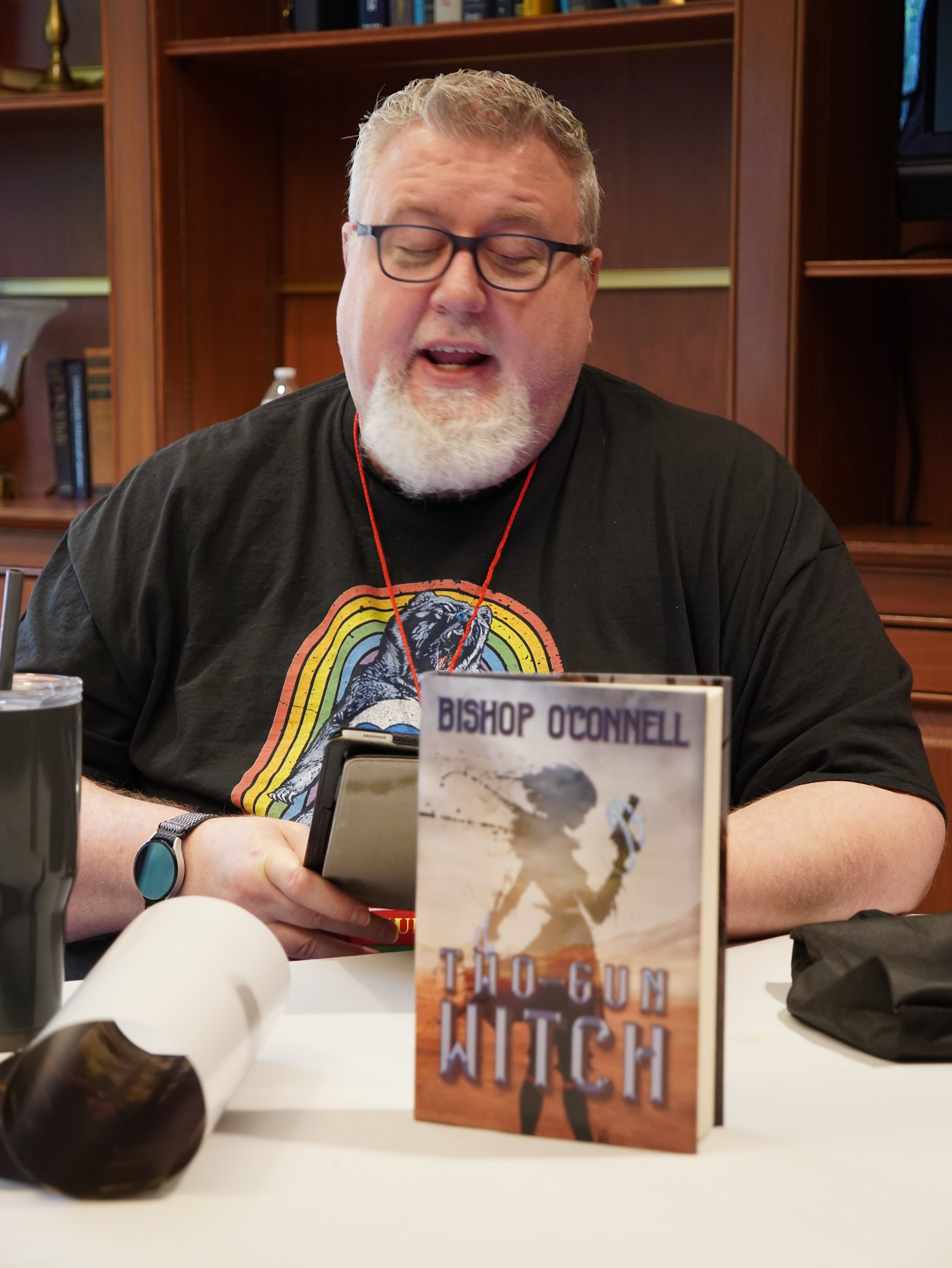
Bishop O'Connell book reading at RavenCon

As of 2024 RavenCon has over 12 different tracks of programming featuring author book readings, animation, art/artists, costuming, current events, science/technology, writing, gaming and literature among them.

=== Book Launches ===
Over the years the convention has hosted numerous book launches. In 2023 they hosted the launch party for Murderbirds: An Avian Anthology, edited by Mike Jack Stombous.

=== Music and media ===
The convention runs multiple musical panels and concerts with a focus on filking acts and filk writing workshops.

=== Gaming ===
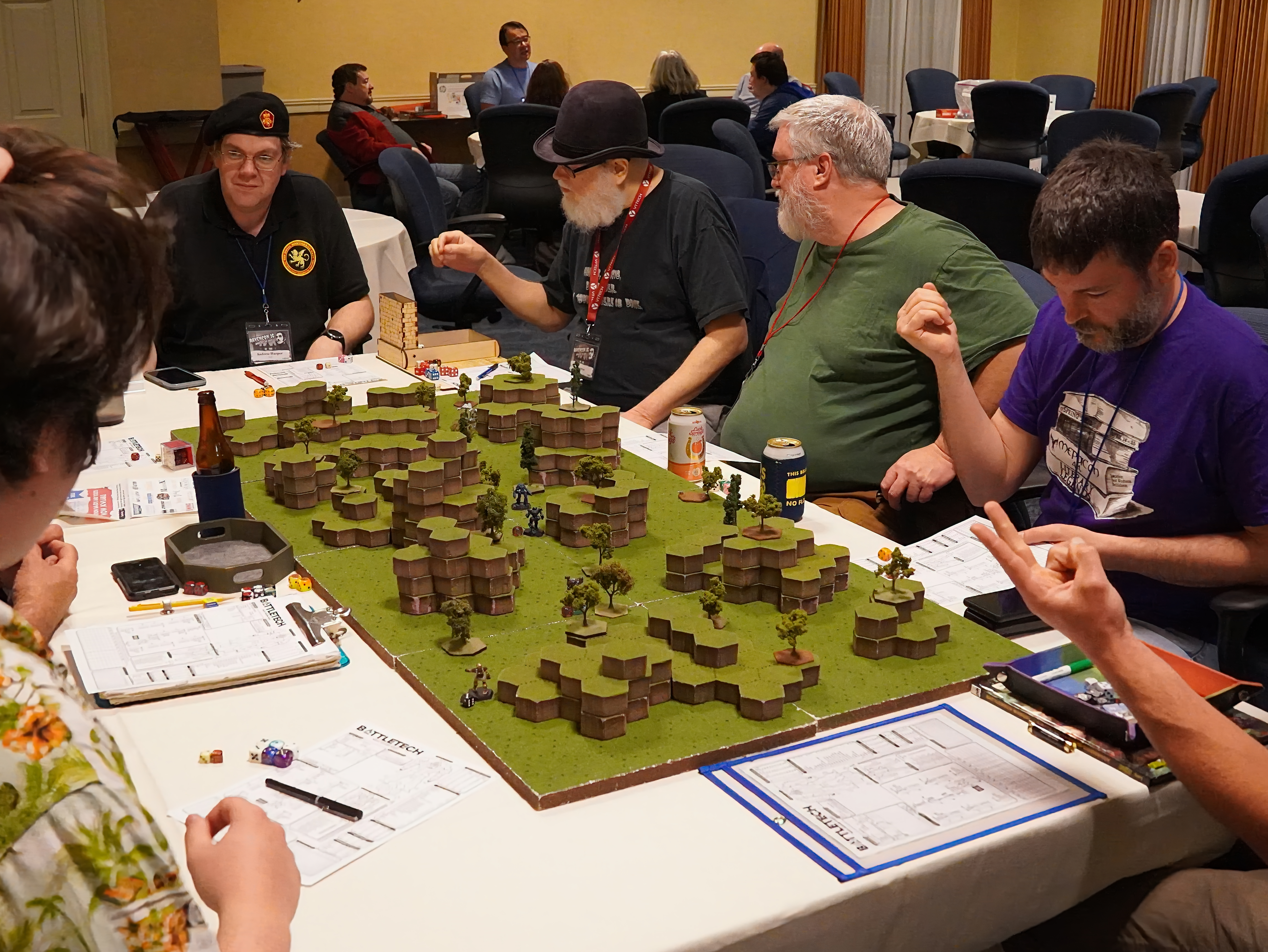
Gaming at RavenCon 16

The convention runs a 24/3 gaming room which includes board games, miniature games, collectible card games, role playing games and more. Events are run by seasoned game masters to just pick up and go.

=== Masquerade ===
RavenCon hosts an open to all cosplay contest the Saturday night of the convention. They also have a hall cosplay contest for those not wanting to brave the stage.

=== Themed events ===
RavenCon 16 also saw the introduction of The Gothic Wonderland Tea Party. In 2016 RavenCon also hosted FanHistoricon 13, with a track of panels and guests that focused exclusively on the history of fandom.

Starting in 2019 RavenCon started running themed Escape Room's for the guests, like Vampire Masquerade and Multiversal Mayhem. In 2022 they started a 2nd Escape Room.

== History ==
RavenCon 2015 was the last time that RavenCon would be held at the DoubleTree by Hilton Richmond-Midlothian in North Chesterfield, Virginia, when the owner of the hotel, Shamin hotels of Chester, Virginia, asked for a 600 percent increase in rates. Following this, RavenCon moved from Richmond and later events would be held in Williamsburg, Virginia at the DoubleTree by Hilton Williamsburg.

RavenCon 15 had been scheduled to take place in April 2020 and was cancelled a few weeks before the convention. It was rescheduled for April 2021 and then cancelled again. To raise money for refunds and to keep the convention operating during the two years of cancellations, authors donated stories for an anthology with the proceeds going to the convention. The fundraiser was successful, and the convention produced CORVID-19: A RavenCon Anthology, edited by Michael D. Pederson.

RavenCon's concert events marked a brief return to Richmond which was made permanent when they signed a contract with Virginia Crossings Hotel and Conference Center in Glen Allen, Virginia. After RavenCon 14.5, all future events would be held in Richmond.

== RavenCon past events ==
Year	Dates	Name	Venue	Location	Guests of Honor
2006	April 21–2	RavenCon 2006	Doubletree Inn at the Richmond Airport	Sandston, Virginia	Terry Brooks - author, Tom Kidd - artist, Lee & Alexis Gilliland - fans
2007	April 27–29	RavenCon 2007	Doubletree Inn at the Richmond Airport	Sandston, Virginia	Robert J. Sawyer - author, Steve Stiles - artist, Jan Howard Finder - fan
2008	April 25–27	RavenCon 2008			C.S. Friedman - author, Stephen Hickman - artist
2009	April 24–26	RavenCon 2009			Jack McDevitt - author, Alan F. Beck - artist
2010	April 9–11	RavenCon 2010	Holiday Inn Koger Center	Richmond, Virginia	Rachel Caine - author, R. Cat Conrad - artist, Steve Long - gaming
2011	April 8–10	RavenCon 2011	Holiday Inn Koger Center	Richmond, Virginia	John Ringo - author, Kurt Miller - artist
2012	April 13–15	RavenCon 2012	Holiday Inn Koger Center	Richmond, Virginia	Glen Cook - author, Matthew Stewart - artist
2013	April 5–7	RavenCon 2013	Holiday Inn Koger Center	Richmond, Virginia	Kevin J. Anderson - author, Rebecca Moesta - author
2014	April 25–27	RavenCon 2014	Richmond-Midlothian (formerly the Holiday Inn Koger Center)	North Chesterfield, Virginia	Elizabeth Bear - author
2015	April 24–26	RavenCon 2015			Allen Steele - author, Frank Wu and his wife Brianna Wu
2016	April 29–May 1	RavenCon 11			Sharon Lee and Steve Miller - authors, Vincent Di Fate - artist, Ted White - special, Jason Whitt - fan
2017	April 28–30	RavenCon 12			Mercedes Lackey - author, Larry Dixon - artist, Chuck Gannon and Ed Beard Jr. - special, Professor Sparks - science, Chris AdottaSmith - fan
2018	April 20–22	RavenCon 13			Chuck Wendig - author, Mark Cline - artist, The Vailix - music
2018	September 21–23	RavenCon 13.5	Four Points Sheraton Richmond		R.S. Belcher - author, MC Lars, George Hrab, Reverend Billy C. Wirtz, Misbehavin' Maidens - music
2019	April 5–7	RavenCon 14			Melinda M. Snodgrass - author, Nikole McDonald-Jones - artist, the Library Bards - music
2021	August 8	RavenCon 14.5	Virginia Crossings Hotel and Conference Center	Glen Allen, Virginia	Mikey Mason, Dimensional Riffs, Chuck Parker, Dirty Metal Lefty, Dr. Shock and the Electrodes -performers
2022	April 29–May 1	RavenCon 15	Virginia Crossings Hotel and Conference Center	Glen Allen, Virginia	Terry Brooks - author, Rhiannon's Lark - music
2023	April 21–23	RavenCon 16	Virginia Crossings Hotel and Conference Center	Glen Allen, Virginia	Esther Friesner and Charles Pellegrino - authors Count Gore de Vol - special.
2024	April 26–28	RavenCon 17	Virginia Crossings Hotel and Conference Center	Glen Allen, Virginia	Ellen Datlow - editor, Ursula Vernon, aka T. Kingfisher - author
2025	April 25–27	RavenCon 18	Virginia Crossings Hotel and Conference Center	Glen Allen, Virginia	Alix Harrow, author
2026	April 24–26	RavenCon 2026	Virginia Crossings Hotel and Conference Center	Glen Allen, Virginia	David Brin, author; K.B. Wagers, Author; Ruth Sanderson, Artist
