= GameFace Labs =

Former American technology company

GameFace Labs, LLC
- Industry: Virtual reality
- Founded: September 2013; 12 years ago in London, United Kingdom
- Headquarters: San Francisco, California, United States

GameFace Labs is an American technology company that develops hardware and software for the consumer virtual reality market. It was founded in 2013 by Edward Mason. The company had headquarters in San Francisco, with international offices in London, United Kingdom.

The company's first product is a standalone headset that features an onboard Nvidia Tegra SoC (system on a chip) and does not require a tethered connection to a computer or console in order to operate. GameFace Labs is a founding member of the Open Source Virtual Reality project (OSVR) and the Immersive Technology Alliance. In December 2015, GameFace Labs joined Valve's OpenVR ecosystem.

== Development ==
During Insomnia Gaming Festival 49 (2013), the company revealed its first prototype; a standalone headset featuring a 720p LCD panel and an Nvidia Tegra 3 SoC. At CES 2014, the company showcased an updated prototype with a 1080p OLED display and a Tegra 4 SoC.

In June 2014, the company showcased the first iteration of its user interface, allowing users to launch applications inside a virtual environment, as well as invite friends from other platforms to enjoy and collaborate on content inside the same virtual space. In June 2014, the company also demoed its Mk V prototype at E3 - running on a version of Nvidia's Tegra K1 SoC. The Mk V headset was the first publicly demoed headset to include a 1440p display, which was supplied by Samsung. The K1 prototype utilized Nvidia's mobile Kepler architecture, which means it supported Android content that used DirectX 11 and OpenGL 4.4 and was also compatible with all Google Cardboard content.

At 2017's E3 expo, GameFace Labs demoed its seventh standalone prototype: a multi-platform headset supporting Android / DayDream content, as well as full 6DoF positional tracking inside an Android environment. The prototype featured dual OLED display panels, low persistence display technology and support for 6DoF input control via a wireless IR beacon (in January 2018 the company revealed it had been developing an ARM-based implementation of Valve's generation 2 Lighthouse technology, using GameFace's custom firmware). The company also showed off an Alpha build of its developer platform, allowing users to share and download content up to 1000x faster than traditional downloading methods.

In May 2018, GameFace Labs began shipping developer kits powered by Nvidia's TX2 SoC, which makes the GameFace Labs developer kit the first consumer electronics device to use the TX2. The GameFace Labs developer kit is the only system to pair the TX2 SoC with an Android Operating system.

== Awards ==
In 2014, GameFace Labs was awarded 'Hack of Honor' at the annual Penguicon open source convention
