= Wendy Webb =

American writer

- Born: Wendy K. Webb; August 18, 1962 (age 64); St. Louis Park, Minnesota, U.S.
- Occupations: Journalist, novelist
- Writing career
- Period: 1992–present
- Genre: Gothic suspense fiction
- Website: wendykwebb.com

Wendy K. Webb (born August 18, 1962) is an American fiction author. Her books have received several awards, including the Minnesota Book Award for fiction in 2011 and 2017.

== Early life and education ==
Webb was born and raised in St. Louis Park, Minnesota, a suburb of Minneapolis. When Webb was in grade school, the school librarian encouraged her to read A Wrinkle in Time by Madeleine L'Engle. After reading that book, she knew from that point on that she was destined to be an author.

She attended the University of Minnesota, where she graduated with a major in political science and minors in French and history. Immediately after graduation, she lived in France with two of her friends. Upon returning to the United States, she got an internship in Washington, D.C., with a congressman, and later with a Minnesota senator.

== Writing career ==
After returning to Minnesota, Webb got her first writing job with a Minneapolis-based weekly arts and entertainment newsletter, City Pages. A career journalist, Webb has also written for the Huffington Post and USA Today The Economist and countless other publications. She was the editor-in-chief of a lifestyle monthly, Duluth Superior Magazine, until the publication closed in 2014.

Webb's first novel, The Tale of Halcyon Crane, is a modern ghost story that won the Minnesota Book Award for fiction in 2011. Her second novel, The Fate of Mercy Alban, depicts the uncovering of a hidden family scandal. The book was on the Indie Bestseller List for six weeks. The End of Temperance Dare, won the Minnesota Book Award for Genre Fiction in 2017 and has been optioned for film and television. Daughters of the Lake, hit Number One on the Amazon bestseller list and was published in 2018.The Haunting of Brynn Wilder also hit Number One on the Amazon bestseller list. In 2025, The Witches of Santo Stefano was nominated for a Minnesota Book Award in Genre Fiction.

== Personal life ==
Webb lives in Minneapolis with her family.

== Works ==
- The Tale of Halcyon Crane (2010)
- The Fate of Mercy Alban (2013)
- The Vanishing (2014)
- The End of Temperance Dare (2017)
- Daughters of the Lake (2018)
- The Haunting of Brynn Wilder (2020)
- The Keepers of Metsan Valo (2021)
- The Stroke of Winter (2022)
- The Witches of Santo Stefano (2024)
