= Stellarcon =

Speculative fiction convention

StellarCon
- Status: Defunct
- Genre: Speculative fiction
- Location: Greensboro, North Carolina
- Country: United States
- Organizer: The Science Fiction Fantasy Federation of the University of North Carolina at Greensboro

StellarCon was a general, speculative fiction convention held in the Greater Metro area of Greensboro, North Carolina, and High Point, usually around mid-March. Average attendance at the convention was around 500 people.

It hosted a variety of related programming, including guest panel discussions, book readings, demonstrations, workshops, roleplaying games, board games, card games, robot battles, and a costume contest. Guest speakers generally include authors, artists, game designers, costumers, and media celebrities. Additional attendees are vendors, selling a variety of merchandise, and fan groups such as the 501st Legion (Stormtroopers), Klingon Assault Group, Star Fleet, The Browncoats, Stargate:SO-Com, Shadowmoor, and The Buccaneers of the Atlantic Coast. Other conventions host tables such as Dragon*Con, ConCarolinas, RavenCon, and NekoCon.

StellarCon was produced by The Science Fiction Fantasy Federation of the University of North Carolina at Greensboro (UNCG). The convention staff consisted of volunteers from the UNCG student body, UNCG alumni, and professionals from throughout the southeastern United States.

== History ==
On March 20, 1976, The Science Fiction Fantasy Federation held the first StellarCon as a one-day mini-convention whose main guest was Jack Townsend, then the president of the Walter Koenig Fan Club. Since that date, StellarCon has grown into a full 3-day event. The conventions were initially held in Elliott University Center, on the campus of UNCG, until StellarCon 16 in 1992, when Jeff Smith, the convention manager that year, took it off campus for the first time to a local hotel. It has remained off-campus since that date.

In July 2006, StellarCon was selected to host the 46th annual DeepSouthCon, which took place in March 2008.
