= William Mark Simmons =

American novelist

Wm. Mark Simmons
- Author Wm. Mark Simmons in his study in 2007
- Born: February 20, 1953 (age 73); Independence, Missouri, U.S.
- Occupations: Broadcaster; actor; journalist; novelist
- Writing career
- Genres: Fantasy, speculative fiction, science fiction, humor, horror

Wm. (William) Mark Simmons, born 1953 in Independence, Missouri, is an American writer best known for his humorous fantasy and horror novels.

Simmons has worked as a journalist, educator, entertainer, and broadcaster, spending more than 30 years in the latter category working in classical music formats for National Public Radio affiliates.

Although he garnered awards as a journalist in his twenties, he did not turn his talents to long-form fiction until his late thirties, publishing his first novel in 1990. A Compton Crook Award finalist, he made Locus Magazine's "Best Lists" in 1991.

A member of the Science Fiction and Fantasy Writers of America (SFWA), Simmons presently lives in Hutchinson, Kansas where he is the music director and Classical Morning host for the Radio Kansas network.

In 2010 Simmons was the Interfilk guest musician at FilkOntario 20, a yearly Filk music conference and convention in Ontario, Canada.

== Bibliography ==
=== The Dreamland Chronicles ===
- In the Net of Dreams (1990, ISBN 0-445-21016-8) (Compton Crook Award finalist; LOCUS Best List, 1991)
- When Dreams Collide (1992, ISBN 0-446-36154-2)
- The Woman of His Dreams (2002)

Anthologised as The Dreamland Chronicles (ISBN 1-892065-60-6) in 2002.

=== Chris Cséjthe (Half/Life) series ===
- One Foot in the Grave (1996, ISBN 0-671-87721-6)
- Dead on My Feet (2003, ISBN 0-7434-3610-5 hardcover, ISBN 1-4165-0910-0 trade paperback)
- Habeas Corpses (2005, ISBN 1-4165-0913-5)
- Dead Easy (2007, ISBN 1-4165-2132-1 hardback)
- A Witch in Time (2019)

=== Pathfinder (serialized in episodic novellas) ===
- Pathfinder I (2007, ISBN 1-893687-75-9 chapbook)
