= List of gaming conventions =

This is a list of noteworthy gaming conventions (Note: A convention is presumed noteworthy if it has received significant coverage in reliable sources that are independent of the convention and satisfies the inclusion criteria for a stand-alone article.) from around the world. This list is sectioned by location, and each gaming convention includes the dates during which it is typically held. Dates listed are approximate or traditional time periods for each convention.

== Multiple locations ==
- Game Market, location varies
- Knutepunkt, alternating between Norway, Sweden, Denmark and Finland
- MineCon, location varies
- Penny Arcade Expo, annually at several locations in the US, and in Melbourne, Australia
- TwitchCon, semi-annually once in different venues across Europe & once in the US

== Asia-Pacific ==
=== Australia ===
- Arcanacon – Melbourne in January
- AVCon – Adelaide typically in July at various locations
- Melbourne International Games Week – Melbourne, October–November, various locations
- PAX (event) – Melbourne in October
- Supanova Pop Culture Expo – various dates and locations

=== China ===
- ChinaJoy – Shanghai in July
- Penny Arcade Expo GC Play – Guangzhou, China in November

=== Japan ===
- Tokyo Game Show – Chiba in September

=== New Zealand ===
- Armageddon – Auckland, Wellington, Hamilton and Christchurch
- Wellycon – Wellington, in late May and/or early June

=== Philippines ===
- Philippine Game Festival – Manila in October

=== South Korea ===
- G-Star – Busan in November

== Europe ==
=== Czech Republic ===
- Game Developers Session – Prague in November

=== Denmark ===
- Fastaval – Århus during Easter
- Nordic Game Jam – Copenhagen in January–February

=== Finland ===
- Ropecon – Helsinki in late July
- Assembly – Helsinki in early August (Assembly Summer), and in early February (Assembly Winter)

=== France ===
- Festival Ludique International de Parthenay (FLIP) – Parthenay in July
- Paris Games Week (PGW) – Paris in November
- DreamHack – Centre international de congrès de Tours in May

=== Germany ===
- Gamescom – Köln in August
- Internationale Spieltage Spiel – Essen in October
- Nuremberg International Toy Fair – Nuremberg in February

=== Ireland ===
- Games Fleadh – LIT Tipperary in late March
- Warpcon – University College Cork in late January

=== Italy ===
- Lucca Comics & Games – Lucca in early November
- Hellana Games – Agliana in April
- Romics – Rome in April and October

=== Norway ===
- The Gathering – Hamar during Easter

=== Poland ===
- Polcon – on the last weekend of August, location changes every year
- Pyrkon – Poznań in June

=== Portugal ===
- Lisboa Games Week – in November, in Lisbon

=== Romania ===
- East European Comic Con

=== Russia ===
- IgroMir – Moscow at the end of September
- Russian Game Developers Conference
- Comic-Con Russia

=== Sweden ===
- Gothcon – Gothenburg, during Easter, since 1977
- DreamHack – Jönköping & Skellefteå since 1994

=== Switzerland ===
- FANTASY BASEL – The Swiss Comic Con in May, Basel
- ZURICH POP CON & Game Show in September/October, Zurich

=== United Kingdom ===
- EGX – Birmingham, England & London, England
- Multiplay's Insomnia Gaming Festival – NEC Birmingham
- Northern Lights Pinball Show – annual hobby gaming convention held in Manchester, usually October/November
- UK Games Expo – annual hobby gaming convention held at the Hilton, NEC in May/June

== Latin America ==
=== Brazil ===
- Brasil Game Show (BGS) – São Paulo, São Paulo in October
- Gamercom – Florianópolis, Santa Catarina in July
- Gamescom Latam – São Paulo, São Paulo

=== Mexico ===
- Electronic Game Show – Mexico City in October

== North America ==
=== Canada ===
- Calgary Comic and Entertainment Expo (Calgary Expo) – Calgary, Alberta in April
- CanGames – Ottawa, Ontario in May
- Enthusiast Gaming Live Expo – Toronto, Ontario in October
- FallCon – Calgary, Alberta in August
- Fan Expo Canada – Toronto, Ontario in August or September
- Hal-Con – Halifax, Nova Scotia in November
- Montreal International Games Summit (MIGS) – Montréal, Quebec in December
- Pure Speculation – Edmonton, Alberta in November
- VCON – Vancouver, British Columbia in October
- DreamHack – Montréal, Quebec in September

=== United States ===
Arranged by regional divisions used by the United States Census Bureau

==== North East ====
- Arisia – Boston, Massachusetts in January
- Carnagecon – Killington, Vermont in early November
- ConnectiCon – Hartford, Connecticut in July
- FlightSimCon – New England Air Museum, Windsor Locks, Connecticut in June
- Intercon – Chelmsford, Massachusetts in early March
- Penny Arcade Expo (PAX) East – Boston, Massachusetts in March or April
- PortConMaine – Portland, Maine in late June
- Vericon – Cambridge, Massachusetts in late March

===== Middle Atlantic =====
New Jersey, New York, and Pennsylvania

- DexCon – Morristown, New Jersey in July
- Genericon – Troy, New York in February/March
- Historicon – Lancaster, Pennsylvania in July
- I-CON – Long Island, New York at Stony Brook University in March/April
- IndieCade East – Museum of the Moving Image in Queens, New York in February
- Penny Arcade Expo (PAX) Unplugged – Philadelphia, Pennsylvania in December
- PrinceCon – Princeton, New Jersey
- TooManyGames – Oaks, Pennsylvania in June
- World Boardgaming Championships – Seven Springs, Pennsylvania in late July

==== Midwest ====
===== East North Central =====
Illinois, Indiana, Ohio, Michigan, and Wisconsin

- Archon – Collinsville, Illinois in October
- ConCoction – Cleveland, Ohio in March
- Gary Con – Lake Geneva, Wisconsin in March
- Gen Con – Indianapolis, Indiana in July/August
- Marmalade Dog – Kalamazoo, Michigan in the first quarter
- Midwest Gaming Classic – Milwaukee, Wisconsin in April
- Origins Game Fair – Columbus, Ohio in late June
- Penguicon – Troy, Michigan in April
- Winter Fantasy – Fort Wayne, Indiana in January

===== West North Central =====
Iowa, Kansas, Minnesota, Missouri, Nebraska, North Dakota, and South Dakota

- DemiCon – Des Moines, Iowa, first weekend each May
- Gamicon – Iowa City, Iowa, in February

===== South Atlantic =====
Delaware, District of Columbia, Florida, Georgia, Maryland, North Carolina, South Carolina, Virginia, and West Virginia

- Dragon Con – Atlanta, Georgia on Labor Day weekend
- Historicon – Fredericksburg, Virginia in July
- MAGFest – National Harbor, Maryland, in January
- MegaCon – Orlando, Florida, in May
- MineCon – Orlando, Florida on the 2nd weekend of November (2013; other years may vary)
- MomoCon – Atlanta, Georgia in May
- PrezCon – Charlottesville, Virginia, President's Day weekend
- RavenCon – Richmond, Virginia, in April
- Stellarcon – High Point, North Carolina in March

===== East South Central =====
Alabama, Kentucky, Mississippi, and Tennessee

- Chattacon – Chattanooga, Tennessee at the end of January
- CoastCon – Biloxi, Mississippi in early March
- Games Workshop Games Day – Memphis, Tennessee, Tennessee in mid-summer
- Hypericon – Nashville, Tennessee in early summer
- Lexicon Gaming Convention – Lexington, Kentucky in April
- MidSouthCon – Memphis, Tennessee, in March
- MOBICON – Mobile, Alabama in May
- Yama-Con – Pigeon Forge, Tennessee in December

===== South West Central =====
Arkansas, Louisiana, Oklahoma, and Texas

- BGG.CON – Dallas, Texas in late November
- Comicpalooza – Houston, Texas over Memorial Day weekend in late May
- QuakeCon – Dallas, Texas in early August
- SXSW – Austin, Texas in mid-March

==== West ====
===== Mountain =====
Arizona, Colorado, Idaho, Montana, Nevada, New Mexico, Utah, and Wyoming

- Fan Expo Denver – Denver, Colorado in June
- Phoenix Fan Fusion – Phoenix, Arizona in June
- SaltCON – Layton, Utah in March

===== Pacific =====
- BlizzCon – Anaheim, California, in the fall
- Dragonflight – Seattle, Washington, second weekend in August
- DunDraCon – San Ramon, California, on Presidents' Day weekend in February
- Game Developers Conference – San Francisco, California, in March
- GameStorm – Portland, Oregon, in March
- GameSoundCon – Los Angeles, California, in the Fall
- Gamex – Los Angeles, California, on Memorial Day weekend in May
- Gateway – Los Angeles, California, on Labor Day weekend in September
- GaymerX – San Francisco, California
- IndieCade Festival – Los Angeles, California, in early October
- MAGWest – San Jose, California, in August
- Northwest Pinball and Arcade Show – Seattle, Washington in June
- Norwescon – Seattle, Washington, in March/April (Easter weekend)
- OrcCon – Los Angeles, California, on Presidents' Day weekend in February
- OryCon – Portland, Oregon, in November
- PAX – Seattle, Washington, in August
- RadCon – Pasco, Washington, on Presidents' Day weekend in February
- SpoCon – Spokane, Washington, in August

== Defunct and on-hiatus conventions ==
These are notable conventions that have at one time existed, but have either gone on hiatus for more than one year, or have finished operating entirely.

- Chimera – Auckland, New Zealand
- CONduit – Salt Lake City, Utah, United States
- E for All – Los Angeles, California, United States
- Electronic Entertainment Expo (E3) – Los Angeles, California, United States
- Gamers' Day – Riyadh, Saudi Arabia
- GottaCon – Victoria, British Columbia, Canada
- Penny Arcade Expo (PAX) South – San Antonio, Texas in January
- RTX – Austin, Texas, United States
- SaikoroWars – Paddock Halls, Bahrain International Circuit, Bahrain
- Trinoc*coN – Raleigh, North Carolina, United States
- Ziggurat Con – Tallil Airbase, Iraq; premiere of this event and the first con in a combat zone.

== See also ==
- List of anime conventions
- List of comic book conventions
- List of furry conventions
- List of multigenre conventions
- List of My Little Pony conventions
- List of science fiction conventions
- List of Worldcons
