= Bingle =

Bingle may refer to:

== Surname ==
- Don Bingle (born 1954), American attorney and author
- Hanne Bingle (born 1958), Danish women's rights activist, London Underground driver, and powerlifter
- Hendrik Johannes Jacob Bingle (1910–2007), South African academic
- Lara Worthington (née Bingle, born 1987), Australian model
- Linda M. Bingle, game designer
- Mr. Bingle, fictional snowman assistant to Santa Claus
- Walter Bingle (1861-1928), Australian public servant

== Other ==
- Bing Crosby (1903–1977), nicknamed Der Bingle in Germany
- Bingle, slang term for a car accident
- Bingle Bangle, play by South Korean group AOA
- Bingles, Australian sitcom
