= Molecule (disambiguation) =

A molecule is an electrically neutral group of two or more atoms held together by chemical bonds.

Molecule, molecules, or molecular may also refer to:

- Molecules (journal)
- "Molecules", a song by Disclosure on their Caracal album
- "Molecules", a song by Hayley Kiyoko song on her Expectations album
- The Molecules, an American band
- Molecule (comics), a superhero in the DC Comics universe
- Molecular (game), a chemistry-themed strategy game from Inside The Box Board Games
- Molecular (Mutant X), a type of science-fiction character
