= GameStorm (convention) =

- Status: Active
- Genre: Tabletop games
- Locations: Portland, Oregon
- Country: United States
- Inaugurated: 1998
- Most recent: 2026
- Attendance: 1,000-1,500
- Organizer: Oregon Science Fiction Conventions, Inc
- Website: https://gamestorm.org

GameStorm is a fan-run not-for-profit annual gaming convention held in the spring in the Portland, Oregon metro area.

== History ==
GameStorm started in 1998 as a fan-run event at the Clackamas, Oregon Denney's Convention Center. The GameStorm group often provides gaming programming at OryCon and other conventions in the Pacific Northwest as well, and has an extensive game library. GameStorm also hosts panel discussions about games and gaming-related topics, provides space for designers to play-test new products, and cross-promotes for other area conventions.

GameStorm provides a number of different activities for gaming fandom:

- Panel discussion topics, often with gaming industry professionals
- Role-playing games (RPG)
- Live action role-playing games (LARP)
- Miniature figure (gaming)
- Collectible card games (CGG)
- Board games
- Video console gaming

GameStorm, like OryCon, is run entirely by fans, with no paid staff, and is sponsored by Oregon Science Fiction Conventions, Inc. (OSFCI), a 501(c)3 not-for-profit corporation.

Iteration	Dates	Location	Attendance	Notes
GameStorm 10	March 2008	Red Lion at the Quay - Vancouver, WA	750	Guests of Honor: Robin Laws and Jay Tummelson
GameStorm 11	March 26–29, 2009	Hilton - Vancouver, WA	736	Guests of Honor: Rob Alexander (first-ever Artist GoH), Andy Collins, Rob Heinsoo, Andy and Kristen Looney; debut of Video games
GameStorm 12	March 25–28, 2010	Hilton - Vancouver, WA	802	Guest of Honor: Vincent Baker, Tom Lehmann
GameStorm 13	March 24–27, 2011	Hilton - Vancouver, WA	984	Guests of Honor: Lisa Steenson, Michael A. Stackpole
GameStorm 14	March 22–25, 2012	Hilton - Vancouver, WA	1072	Guests of Honor: Andrew Hackard and Sam Mitschke of Steve Jackson Games, and Jason Bulmahn
GameStorm 15	March 21–24, 2013	Hilton - Vancouver, WA	1188	Guests of Honor: James Ernest, Henry Lopez (Paradigm Concepts)
GameStorm 16	March 20–23, 2014	Hilton - Vancouver, WA	1346	Guests of Honor: Mike Selinker, Shane Lacy Hensley, Lisa Steenson, Zev Shlasinger, Theatre Arcanos (David Coronado, Michelle McNeill, and Matt Branstad)
GameStorm 17	March 19–22, 2015	Hilton - Vancouver, WA	1547	Guests of Honor: Michael Mindes, Creator of Fiasco, Jason Morningstar, and Special Media Guest JR Ralls
GameStorm 18	March 17–20, 2016	Hilton - Vancouver, WA	1550	Guests of Honor: Mike Mulvihill, Shadowrun developer, and Brian Poel
GameStorm 19	March 30 – April 2, 2017	Red Lion Jantzen Beach - Portland, OR	1520	Guests of Honor: Paul Peterson and Jeremy Crawford
GameStorm 20	April 5–8, 2018	Red Lion Jantzen Beach - Portland, OR	1700	
GameStorm 21	March 28–31, 2019	Red Lion Jantzen Beach - Portland, OR	1950	Guests of Honor: Mike Mulvihill, Shadowrun developer, and Brian Poel
GameStorm 22	March 24–27, 2022	Holiday Inn Columbia Riverfront, Jantzen Beach - Portland, OR	900	No Guests of Honor
GameStorm 23	March 23-26, 2023	Holiday Inn Columbia Riverfront, Jantzen Beach - Portland, OR	1255	Guest of Honor: Jacob Fryxelius (creator, Terraforming Mars)
GameStorm 24	March 21-24, 2024	Holiday Inn Columbia Riverfront, Jantzen Beach - Portland, OR	1229	Guests of Honor: Jonathan H. Liu (senior editor, GeekDad) and Alex Hart
GameStorm 25	March 20-23, 2025	Double Tree by Hilton, Lloyd Center - Portland, OR	1415	Guest of Honor: Alex Flagg (co-creator, Crafty Games)
GameStorm 26	March 19-22, 2026	Holiday Inn Columbia Riverfront, Jantzen Beach - Portland, OR	1573	Guests of Honor: Fertessa Allyse, Chris Grace (actor), Keith Ammann (The Monsters Know What They're Doing)

== Upcoming GameStorm Convention ==
GameStorm 27 will be March 18th-21st, 2027 at the Holiday Inn Portland - Columbia Riverfront.

== Past guests of honor ==
- Peter Adkison
- Vincent Baker
- Matt Branstad
- Jason Bulmahn
- Andy Collins
- Monte Cook
- David Coronado
- James Ernest
- Alex Flagg
- Jacob Fryxelius
- Richard Garfield
- Andrew Hackard
- Alex Hart
- Rob Heinsoo
- Reiner Knizia
- Robin Laws
- Tom Lehmann
- Jonathan H. Liu
- Steve Long
- Rick Loomis
- Andy and Kristen Looney
- Michelle McNeill
- Sam Mitschke
- Mike Mulvihill
- Brian Poel
- Michael Stackpole
- Lisa Steenson
- Jay Tummelson
