= Strategicon =

Strategicon or Strategikon may refer to:

- The Strategikon of Maurice, a sixth-century Byzantine manual of war
- The Strategikon of Kekaumenos, an eleventh-century Byzantine manual of war
- Strategicon (gaming conventions), a series held in California
