= Jay Tummelson =

Jay Tummelson is the founder of Rio Grande Games.

== Career ==
Jay Tummelson was the top-ranked RPGA Judge, when Don Bingle and Linda Bingle brought him on as a third owner of their company 54°40' Orphyte after they purchased the product rights for Pacesetter Ltd's games. Tummelson met Darwin Bromley of Mayfair Games through his connection with 54°40' Orphyte, and joined Mayfair Games in 1995, and for the next two years was involved with licensing German games under the direction of Bromley for the company to produce American versions; under Tummelson in 1996 alone, German games such as Grand Prix, Modern Art, Manhattan, Streetcar, and The Settlers of Catan were finally published in the United States. Tummelson was laid off from Mayfair, and founded Rio Grande Games in 1998, which became the major United States Eurogame publisher for many years, by taking the approach of using the same artwork and components as the original games and sharing the cost of printing with the European publishers. Tummelson sold his shares in 54°40' Orphyte after founding Rio Grande Games, leaving the Bingles solely in charge of their company.
