= UK Games Expo =

UK annual game convention

- Genre: tabletop-game convention; trade fair
- Frequency: Annually
- Venue: National Exhibition Centre; Hilton Birmingham Metropole
- Coordinates: 52°27′12″N 1°43′10″W
- Founded: 2007
- Founder: Richard Denning; Tony Hyams
- Next event: 4 June - 6 June 2027
- Attendance: 87,837
- Organiser: UK Games Expo Ltd
- Website: UK Games Expo

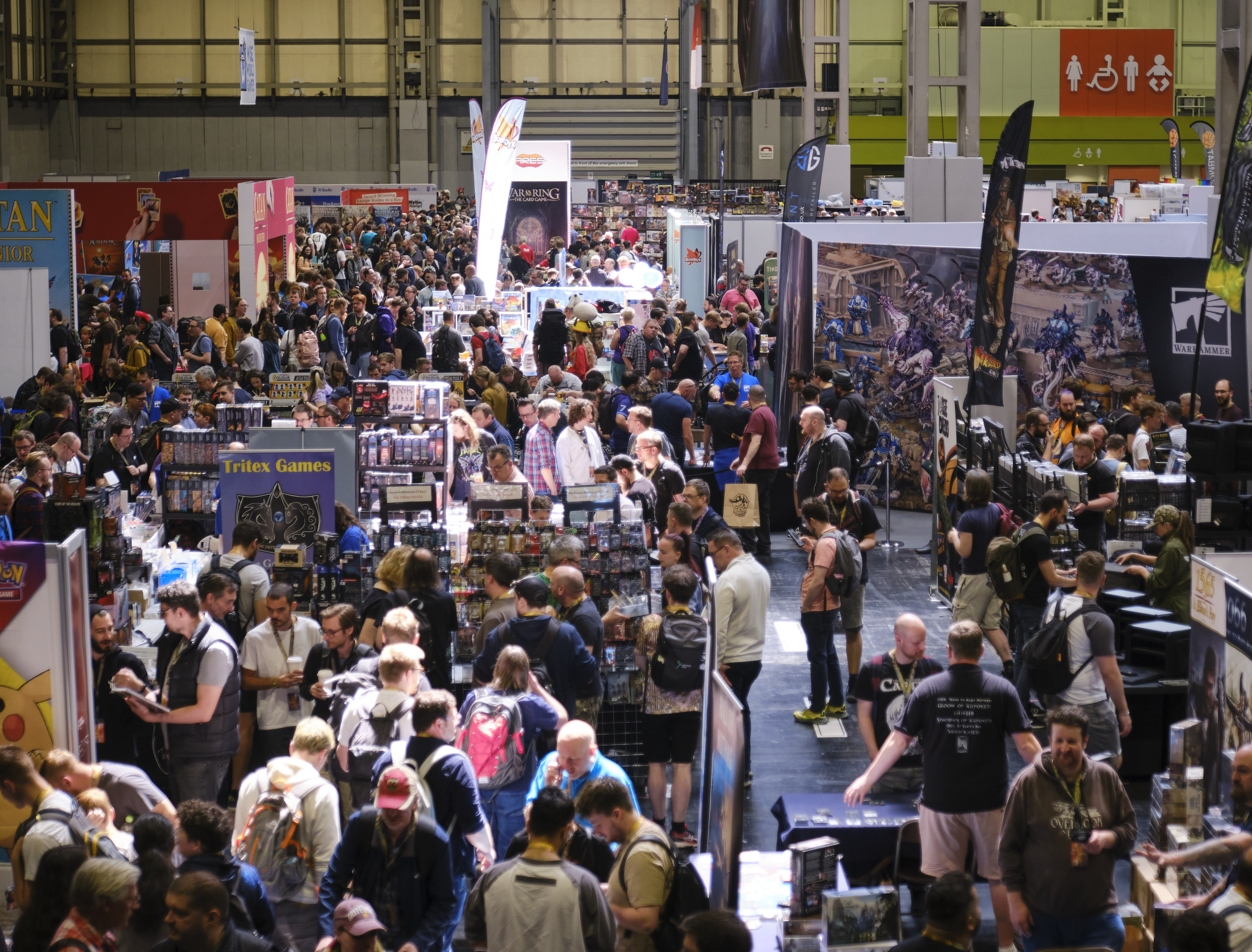
Hall 1 at the NEC Birmingham during UK Games Expo 2023

UK Games Expo (UKGE) is a tabletop-game convention and trade fair held at the National Exhibition Centre (NEC) and the Hilton Birmingham Metropole.

UK Games Expo (UKGE) is the largest Hobby Games Convention in the UK First held in 2007, the event is now held annually at the National Exhibition Centre in Birmingham and currently hosts over 51,196 unique guests.

UKGE features a range of exhibitors, events, open games, demos, and tournaments including the UK Carcassonne Championship, and the UK Agricola Championship.

All forms of tabletop games are represented at the event including board games, role-playing games, card games and war games. Organisers each year also hold the UKGE Awards with two categories, the People's Choice Awards as voted on by attendees of the event and the Judges Choice Awards.

Cosplay has played an increasing part at the event over the past few years with several cosplay groups regularly entertaining event-goers across the three-day event.

== History ==
The UK Games Expo was first held in 2007, organised by Richard J. Denning and Tony Hyams. Apart from 2020 the event has grown year on year and in 2026 had over 87,837 daily participations, making it the largest tabletop games event in the UK and the third largest in the world. In 2020 the event was held online due to the COVID-19 pandemic. The event returned in person in 2021 with additional COVID-19 guidelines. In 2022 the event removed the COVID-19 guidelines introduced the prior year. In 2024 it broke exhibitor and attendance records from 2023.

In 2025, the show grew again to establish itself at the top table of worldwide tabletop game conventions. Trade was now in halls 2, 3, 3a and 4. In 2026, which was the 20th anniversary of UK Games Expo, they saw attendance hit record levels with 87,837 visitors across the weekend, showing the industry is thriving in the current climate.

In 2008, the expo hosted the official launch of Dungeons & Dragons 4th Edition in the UK.

Show features at UK Games Expo:

- The world's largest bring & buy.
- More than 900 exhibitors.
- Live entertainment.
- Tournaments and national events in a variety of game systems.
- Seminars.
- 4000+ Open gaming seats.
- Cosplay and living history village.
- Dedicated family zone.

Special Guests at previous UK Games Expo include:

- Luke Gygax
- Sir Ian Livingstone
- No Rolls Barred
- The Dice Tower
- Shut Up and Sit Down
- No Pun Included
- Alex Kammer
- Tim Hutchings
- Simon Fisher-Becker
- Ben Aaronovitch
- Alex Yeager
- Chris Barrie
- John Robertson
- Hugo Myatt
- Kenny Baker
- Colin Baker

=== Attendance ===
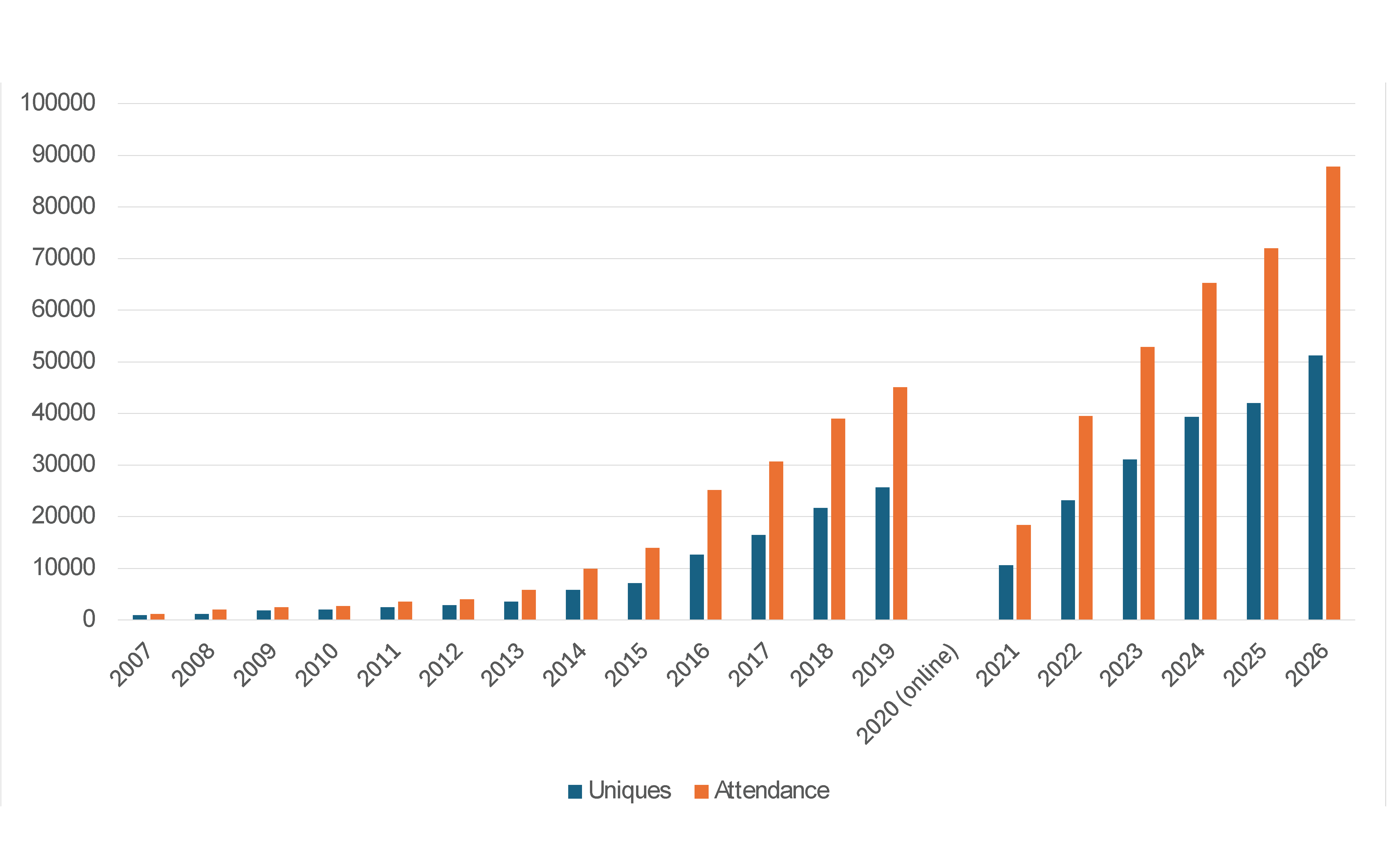
Annual attendance 2007–2026

Attendance figures released by the organizers are published each year in their exhibitor pack.

In 2026 the Expo broke the single-day NEC attendance record

Year	Uniques	Attendance
2007	900	1,200
2008	1,200	2,000
2009	1,800	2,500
2010	2,000	2,700
2011	2,455	3,585
2012	2,879	4,046
2013	3,538	5,805
2014	5,805	9,919
2015	7,162	13,971
2016	12,636	25,149
2017	16,500	30,698
2018	21,700	39,000
2019	25,704	45,097
2020 (online)	N/A	N/A
2021	10,671	18,430
2022	23,163	39,527
2023	31,117	52,888
2024	39,306	65,281
2025	42,000	72,000
2026	51,196	87,837

== UK Games Expo Awards ==
Each year the show awards the UKGE Awards which are split into two broad categories: The People’s Choice, which are voted on by expo attendees, and the Judge’s Choice, which are voted on by invited judges or delegates. UKGE rewards different game styles, including abstract games, strategic games, party games and more, as well as expansions, accessories, role-playing games, novelties, etc.

== People’s Choice Award ==
	Roleplaying Game	Strategy	Family	General	
2026	Ryokos Guide to the Yokai Realms - Loot Tavern Publishing	Luthier: The Art of the Instrument - Paverson Games	Disney Villainous Treacherous Tides - Ravensburger	Battle of Hoth - Days of Wonder	
2025	The One Ring - Moria - Through the Doors of During - Free League Publishing	SETI: Search for Extraterrestrial Intelligence - CGE	Harmonies - Libellud	Australis - Kosmos	
Year	Best Board Game (Euro)	Best Board Game (Strategic)	Best Card Game	Best Strategic Card Game	Best Roleplaying Game
2024	Windmill Valley - Board & Dice.	Voidfall - Mindclash Games.	Skullduggery - Cheatwell Games	Pioneer Rails - Dranda Games	Salvage Union - Leyline Press.
2023	Earth - Inside Up Games	Frostpunk: The Board Game - Glass Cannon Unplugged	Viking Raiders - Neowulf Games	Isle of Trains: All Aboard - Dranda Games	Be Like a Crow - Critical Kit
2022	Lost Ruins of Arnak - Czech Games Edition	Get On Board - iello	Dungeon Decorators - Slugfest	Lord Of The Rings LCG Revised Core - Fantasy Flight Games	Shiver Core - Parable Games
2021	Excavation Earth - Might Boards	Undaunted: North Africa - Osprey Games	Village Green: A Game of Pretty Gardens - Osprey Games	Imperium: Classics - Osprey Games	Vaesen - Free League Publishing
2020 (online)	Tapestry - Stonemaier Games	Dune - Game Force Nine	Solar Storm - Dranda Games	Marvel Champions - Fantasy Flight Games	The Alien RPG - Free League Publishing
2019	Quacks of Quedlinberg	Root	The Mind	Arboretum	Forbidden Lands
2018	Photosynthesis - Blue Orange	Warhammer Underworlds - Games Workshop	Legend of the Five Rings - Fantasy Flight Games	category began in 2019	SINS - First Falling Leaf
2017 (Note: Before 2018 the awards only existed in one category, voted on by attendees.)	SubTerra - Inside the Box Board Games	The Colonists	Statecraft - Inside the Box Board Games	Category began in 2019	Adventures in Middle Earth

== Judges Choice Award ==
Year	Best Board Game (Euro)	Best Board Game (Strategic)	Best Card Game	Best Strategic Card Game	Best Roleplaying Game
2026	Luthier: The Art of the Instrument by Paverson Games	Epochs: Course of Cultures by Ice Makes Limited	Duel for Cardia by Hans im Gluck	Pondscape - Pink Troubadour	Tales of the Old West by Effekt Publishing Ltd
2025	SETI: Search for Extraterrestrial Intelligence - CGE	Cyclades: Legendary Edition by Studio H	LOTR Trick Taking by Office Dog	Star Wars Unlimited: Twilight of the Republic 2 - Fantasy Flight Games	The Magnus Archives Roleplaying Game. by Monte Cook Games LLC
2024	Pampero - Ape Games	Cangaceiros - Ares Games	Trio - Cocktail Games	Pioneer Rails - Dranda Games	Old Gods of Appalachia - Monte Cook Games
2023	Earth - Inside Up Games	New Eden - Schmidt	Viking Raiders - Neowulf Games	Vita Mors - Play With Us Design	Critical Foundation - Gigamic
2022	Bitoku - Devir	The Thing - Ares Games	CULTivate - Pops & Bejou	Lord Of The Rings LCG Revised Core - Fantasy Flight Games	Twilight: 2000 - Free League Publishing
2021	Excavation Earth - Might Boards	Prisma Arena - Hub Games	A Game of Pretty Gardens - Osprey Games	Schotten Totten 2 - Iello	The Dee Sanction - All Rolled Up
2020 (online)	Tapestry - Stonemaier Games	Ishtar - Iello	Solar Storm - Dranda Games	Origlamme - Studio H	Paladin - Chaosium
2019	Architects of the West Kingdom	Root	The Mind	Ruthless	Forbidden Lands
2018	Great Western Trail - Stronghold	Civilisation - Gibsons	Pikoko - Brain Games	N/A - category began in 2019	Adventures in an Age Undreamed - Modiphius

== See also ==
- Festival International des Jeux
- Gen Con
- Hellana Games - Festival of Games and History
- Lucca Comics & Games
- Origins Game Fair
- Spiel
