= Statecraft (disambiguation) =

Statecraft, or statesmanship, is the art of conducting public affairs.

Statecraft may refer to:

- Statecraft (game), a card game
- Statecraft: Strategies for a Changing World, a 2003 book by Margaret Thatcher
