= Lexicon Gaming Convention =

LexiCon
- Status: Active
- Genre: Board Games, RPGs, Miniatures, CosPlay, LARP, Trivia
- Venue: Clarion Hotel, Lexington
- Locations: Lexington, KY
- Country: United States
- Inaugurated: 2014
- Organizer: LexiCon Gaming, LLC
- Website: http://lexicongaming.com

LexiCon Gaming Convention is a tabletop board game focused convention in Lexington, KY, held every spring at the Clarion Hotel and Convention Center. LexiCon features a game library of over 2,000 titles, provided by LexiCon founders, convention supporters, local board game groups and the convention itself.

LexiCon hosts a large number of events These events include Learn-to-Play activities, tournaments, RPG events, Cosplay demonstrations and parties in addition to scheduled individual games. In addition to these events, an exhibit hall with vendors and exhibitors is available to attendees as well as the general public.

LexiCon was founded in 2013 by Lexington natives Chris Grzywacz, Philip Holland and Greg Franseth after Grzywacz and Holland attended GenCon for the first time. Lexington has been home to other gaming conventions, most notably Forge, however none had lasted. Grzywacz stated his intention from the beginning that LexiCon be a permanent fixture in the Lexington community, and the others agreed that there was an untapped demand out there that they could meet. Lexicon Gaming, LLC was officially formed in October 2013, and the date of the inaugural Lexicon Gaming Convention set for May 2–4, 2014.

LexiCon is currently managed by Chris Grzywacz, Greg Franseth, Rob Slevin, and Larry Estep. They started a new convention, CinCityCon Boardgaming and RPG Convention in Cincinnati in Oct. of 2018 at the Sharonville Convention Center. This convention shares many characteristics of LexiCon but has grown larger than LexiCon by its second year.

== LexiCon 2014 ==
LexiCon 2014 was the first year for LexiCon Gaming Convention. The convention itself reported the following statistics for that year:

- 7 International Releases for new games
- 25+ Cosplayers
- 30 Vendors
- 32 players in the Catan Tournament
- 41 totally awesome volunteers and gamemasters
- 48 RPG players
- 50 players in our giant Werewolf game
- 53 straight hours of gaming
- 65 attendees at our Saturday party
- 81 different scheduled events
- 100+ Games given away
- 300+ dollars raised for Big Brothers Big Sisters of the Bluegrass
- 400+ attendees
- 500+ dollars awarded in miniatures prizes
- 1027 Games in the Library

LexiCon 2014 included several unusual or unique events. In 2014 introduced "SmashUp!: The Beat a Little Girl edition." While potentially upsetting in its title, the event is actually a challenge from one of Grzywacz's daughters, a notoriously excellent game player, to every convention attendee. Only one player was able to win out over her. Unlike other regional conventions, which often include an off-site party at a local bar or tavern, Lexicon hosted a Saturday night party onsite. This party became infamous for the impromptu lap dance of a male attendee for Grzywacz. The party also included a 50+ person Werewolf game, a 30+ person Say Anything game as well as numerous plays of Cards Against Humanity and Crap or Slap. Finally, Lexicon introduced an original game, "Lexicon: The Game", as a fundraiser as part of its charity efforts.

Some of the many other events at Lexicon 2014 included a "Magic: The Gathering" tournament, a math trade, a flea market, many Pathfinder RPG campaign events, Warhammer 40K and Fantasy tournaments, War Machine demos, HeroClix tournament, Ticket to Ride tournament, DC Deck Building Game tournament, a Cosplay Contest, Learn 5 Family Games in 90 Minutes, and a Children's Game area.

Holland, Grzywacz and Franseth also worked to keep the tone of the convention light and fun. Each day featured a different theme for the convention organizers. Day 1 featured Pirates, Day 2 was Mad Scientists, and Day 3 had Engineers. Convention attendees were encouraged and welcomed to come in costume. Other costumes included characters from Death Note and Adventure Time as well as original costumes out of fantasy, sci-fi and steampunk universes.

LexiCon set a goal to be open to all attendees and to ensure an environment that was friendly to everyone. Because other conventions have struggled with creating welcoming environments, Greg discussed this topic along with others on The Rad Ass Bitches podcast.

== LexiCon 2015 ==
LexiCon 2015 took place from April 17–19, 2015. Originally scheduled for May in 2014, the organizers decided to change the date to avoid conflicts with local university exams and the Kentucky Derby, although this resulted in more limited hotel space.

In 2015, Kickstarter was introduced as a funding mechanism, with convention backers contributing over $6,000 to support the event. This allowed for longer-term planning and the inclusion of additional items like custom dice and drinking glasses. Packages were also introduced, offering attendees the option to obtain a hotel room along with event enhancements and their badge.

Events at LexiCon 2015 built upon those from the previous year, with some notable changes. The Exhibit Hall was expanded to accommodate more exhibitors, included FLGS (Friendly Local Game Stores) from Lexington (The Rusty Scabbard), Louisville (The Louisville Game Shop), Frankfort (Moonlite Comics), Richmond (Cosmic Oasis) and Cincinnati, as well as game publishers, artisans (e.g., Bardic Kitty), craftspeople and CCG dealers. One of the most popular exhibitors was local coffee company and convention sponsor, Magic Beans Coffee Roasters, whose presence was so well received they are expected to return in 2016.

A second party was added on Saturday night, and the Catan Tournament was elevated to a Regional Qualifier, with lead in events at West 6th Brewing Company and The Rusty Scabbard Harmony Lodge (Hall) Cincinnati (hosted by Cincinnati Geek Meet), and in Louisville (hosted by local gamers).

New additions included a major LARP event, Vampire: The Masquerade, and the inclusion of Artemis: Spaceship Bridge Simulator by Gaming Nomads. Attendance badges were changed to allow participation in Learn-to-Play and Scheduled individual game events without separate fees. A VIP badge with additional amenities, including access to a VIP room, was also introduced.

LexiCon 2015 saw a 42% increase in attendance, with 521 unique attendees and 1080 turnstile attendance. The convention drew attendees from various states across the US and also had international guests from Canada. Popular events included the Catan Tournament, Pandemic Tournament, King of Tokyo tournament, Trivial Breakfasts and Lunch hosted by Greg, evening parties, family and couples Learn-to-Play sessions, ARTEMIS, and an expanded RPG offering.

There were some challenges faced by the LexiCon staff due to the significant increase in attendance. Registration experienced initial difficulties on the first day, and there were limited food options due to a dispute with the venue over food trucks. There were also organizational disruptions in setting up the Vendor Hall and conflicting times for a few events. The organizers have addressed these issues and announced plans to improve in 2016.

The LexiCon library featured a collection of 1,241 titles, larger than the GenCon Library, with a higher satisfaction rate among attendees. The library saw more than twice as many checkouts compared to 2014.

Celebrity attendees were not a traditional focus for LexiCon, but notable game designers such as Philip duBarry (Revolution, Fidelities, Courtier), Corey Young (Gravwell), Tom Cleaver (Valley of the Kings), and Kerry Breitenstein (Crap or Slap) were present. Kentucky Geek Girl, a popular celebrity blogger, and Emery Buterbaugh of The Buterverse podcast hosted several major events.

A special used game auction was held at LexiCon 2015 to raise money for Big Brothers and Big Sisters of the Bluegrass, prompted by an unexpected basement flood at the "LexiCon Library Storage Facility." The auction raised over $250 for BBBS, and over 100 games were given out as prizes throughout the convention.

== LexiCon 2016 ==
LexiCon 2016 has been announced for April 22-24th at the Clarion Convention Center in Lexington, Ky and will once again be sponsored by West 6th Brewing Company and Roosters Wings. A Kickstarter campaign will occur in October and pre-registration is expected to open in early December. Due to the huge popularity of Lexicon 2015, the organizers are prepared to introduce a cap on attendance if pre-registration grows at a similar rate for 2016.

Some events already announced for the 2016 schedule include:

- Settlers of Catan National Qualifying Tournament and Regional feeder events
- Two (2) Pandemic Tournaments
- King of Tokyo Tournament
- Marvel RPG
- Dr Who LARP
- Ticket to Ride Tournament
- Apples to Apples Tournament
- Greg's Trivial Lunch and Breakfasts
- Expanded Learn to Plays and Play to Wins

Lexicon is targeting 150+ scheduled events for 2016.

Several changes have already been disclosed. Lexicon has added 10% more space in the form of special rooms. Lexicon will provide their own secure wireless hot spot and registration staff to avoid the problems from 2015. The Library will be moved back into the main ballroom and have double the dedicated open play space available in addition to spots throughout the convention center and hotel. The Library presently has 1,270 titles and is aiming for over 1,400 by the convention. The Vendor Hall will split the difference between the 2014 and 2015 sizes in order to accommodate more game playing space. A radical change will be introduced for the Friday Night Party. Learn-to-Plays are going to have a set schedule with multiple sessions of each topic available; Lexicon plans to expand the themed sessions such as Couples Games, Cooperative Games, or Deckbuilders.

Lexicon has also announced they will pay to have a wider variety of food offerings available on site. Lexicon is expected to celebrate the release of Cryptozoic's Ghostbusters game by having a Ghostbusters cosplay team on site throughout the convention.

== LexiCon 2017, 2018, & 2019 ==
LexiCon 2017, 2018, and 2019 were held in April at the Clarion Conference Center and continued the tradition set by the previous conventions. It was held in Lexington KY and continued to be sponsored by West Sixth Brewing and Rooster Wings. LexiCon 2019 was highlighted by a significant expansion of the space used at the conference center. New space was added by the conference center in the old gym after a significant remodel of the space, adding more than 7,000 square feet to the convention area. LexiCon 2019 moved the RPG Gaming area here and added 9 more vending spaces.

== LexiCon 2021 ==
Due to the COVID-19 pandemic, Lexicon 2020 was postponed. LexiCon 2021 will be held July 3- August 1, 2021 at the Clarion Conference Center and Hotel. The Clarion Conference Center expanded its Conference Space by 50% in 2019. It recently added a new hallway to help people move to the new space, without entering the pool area. They finished the remodel of this space, which used to be a gym. This will allow LexiCon to expand their board gaming and RPG area significantly, by moving the RPG area into the newly expanded area. This area was significantly remodeled to reduce sound and humidity, this space new space is approximately 7,000 + square feet and can fit 15 or more round 6 foot tables and leave plenty of room for vending spaces around the outside walls. Their "Ginormous Library" of over 2100 games will be available to play, along with various tournaments, learn-to-pays, RPGS, vendors, cosplay contests, Artemis Spaceship Bridge Simulator, parties, and other events.

== Community Involvement and Charity Support ==
While its founders created Lexicon with a mission to provide a unique gaming experience in the Bluegrass and surrounding regions, they also agreed that the convention needed to support wider missions as well. These missions were identified to be two-fold: supporting the local community and supporting a charitable partner.

LexiCon has indicated that they seek to work with local partners in Lexington, in Kentucky and in neighboring states whenever possible. This includes ensuring access to local game companies such as Twilight Creations and Eagle Gryphon Games. In addition they work with local gaming shops like The Rusty Scabbard and D20, along with local businesses like West Sixth Brewing and Roosters Wings. More directly, these partnerships mean tying local businesses to the events in the convention. Thus Lexicon seeks to link each major event with a sponsor and to solicit sponsorships and partnerships from local businesses.

Lexicon supports charities including Big Brothers and Big Sisters of the Bluegrass.
