= Fellowship of the Dice =

- Directed by: Matthew Mishory; Matthew Ross
- Starring: Aimee Graham; Hunter Canning; Joseph Dammann
- Release date: 2025
- Running time: 85 minutes
- Country: United States
- Language: English

Fellowship of the Dice is a film released in 2005 (2007 on DVD), directed by Matthew Ross, and starring Aimee Graham and Price Carson. It combines interviews and scenes from Strategicon 2004 a real-life role playing game convention with a fictional account (mockumentary) of a game with the players portrayed by actors. As the fictional game progresses, it is intercut with interviews and scenes from the convention.

== Plot ==
The movie tracks three plot lines: interviews at a role playing game convention (RPGCon), Elizabeth's (Aimee Graham) interaction with the justice system, and the game in which Elizabeth is a first-time player.

Elizabeth violates her house arrest sentence to attend her first game at the invitation of a stranger she meets in a gaming store. Elizabeth risks jail because of the terms of her sentence. In a key plot twist, she chooses to finish the game session: Because her ankle monitor has been inadvertently activated, she is in danger of re-arrest if she does not immediately return home.

By the end of the movie it is made plain that in gaming with her new companions, Elizabeth has found her path to redemption, her path away from a life of petty crime and drugs. When her parole officer (Price Carson) asks her, “was it worth it?”, she answers, “yes.”

== Cast ==
- Aimee Graham as Elizabeth
- Price Carson as Officer Banus, Elizabeth's parole officer
- Jeff Coatney as Jasper, the Game Master
- Jon Collins as Larry
- Jon Dabach as Kevin
- Lucia Diaz Sas as Gwen
- John Michael Scholl as Jack
- Alastair Surprise as Sanford
- Written by Tom Hietter

== Distributors ==
- Breakthrough Distribution (2005) (USA) (DVD)
- Reel Indie Film (2007) (USA) (DVD), ASIN B000OQDSHC.

== See also ==
- The Gamers (film)
