= Dragonflight =

Dragonflight may refer to:

- Dragonflight (novel), a 1968 science-fiction novel by Anne McCaffrey
- Dragonflight (convention), a gaming convention established in 1980
- Dragonflight (video game), a 1990 role-playing video game
- World of Warcraft: Dragonflight, a 2022 expansion pack for the MMORPG World of Warcraft

== See also ==
- Dragon Flight, a civilian formation flight demonstration team, based at March Air Reserve Base
- The Flight of Dragons, a 1982 animated film by Rankin/Bass Productions
- The Flight of Dragons (book), by Peter Dickinson
- Dragon Fight, a 1989 Hong Kong action film
