= Matthew Ross =

Matthew or Matt Ross may refer to:

- Matthew Ross (minister) (born 1967), minister of the Church of Scotland
- Matt Ross (actor) (born 1970), American actor, director and screenwriter
- Matthew Ross, List of The 4400 characters
- Matthew Michael Ross, film director, of Fellowship of the Dice and other films
- Matthew Ross (filmmaker) (born 1976), writer-director of Frank & Lola
- Matt Ross (soccer coach) (born 1978), Australian soccer coach
