= Earth (board game) =

2023 engine-building board game by Maxime Tardif

- Designers: Maxime Tardif
- Illustrators: M81 Studio; Conor McGoey; Yulia Sozonik; Kenneth Spond
- Publishers: Inside Up Games
- Publication: April 22, 2023; 3 years ago
- Genres: Engine-building, tableau-building
- Players: 1-5
- Playing time: 45-90 minutes
- Website: insideupgames.com/our-games/earth-board-game/

Earth is a 2023 nature-themed, card-driven, engine-building board game designed by Maxime Tardif and published by Inside Up Games.

In the game, one to five players choose one of four actions - planting, composting, watering, or growing - then all players resolve the corresponding effects on their own boards. Over the course of play, they build 4-by-4 tableaux of cards representing plants, terrain, and ecosystems, using card synergies, resources, and scoring conditions to generate points.

Tardif, a pharmacist from Quebec City who had previously designed BrilliAnts and DiverCity, developed the game after deciding to create a plant-themed design during the COVID-19 pandemic. The project was funded on Kickstarter in February 2022, reached its funding goal within two hours, and was released on Earth Day, 22 April 2023.

Upon release, Earth received favorable reviews for its low-downtime action system, strategic depth, and card variety, although some critics felt its low interaction made it resemble multiplayer solitaire. It won both the judges' award and the people's choice award for Best Board Game (European Style) at the 2023 UK Games Expo and the 2023 Solo Award at the International Gamers Awards. Later releases included Earth: Abundance, the Animal Kingdom expansion, and smaller add-ons such as the Disasters Module.

== Development and publication ==
Tardif was a pharmacist in Quebec City before Earth was published, and had previously designed games including BrilliAnts and DiverCity. Tardif has said that designing games offered a creative outlet outside the rigor of pharmacy, and that a long-standing interest in biology and nature shaped the subjects chosen for game design.

Tardif has also said that design usually begins with theme rather than mechanism, preferring to build games around subjects of genuine interest. Because biology and nature were central interests, Tardif gravitated toward a plant- and ecosystem-based theme, and the project that became Earth began after a suggestion at home to make a game about plants during the pandemic. The working title was Planeta Terra, but it was changed to Earth so the name would read more clearly internationally and avoid confusion with the BBC series Planet Earth.

Among Tardif's main design goals were giving players meaningful decision-making power and making the game highly replayable. Tardif chose an engine-building structure because it offered strong strategic variety from game to game, and later wrote that the design aimed to remain highly strategic while keeping simple rules, low setup time, and minimal constraints on play.

The technical side of the design grew well beyond an early plan for a 100-card game. Tardif eventually expanded the project to more than 400 cards and used a spreadsheet-based balancing system in Microsoft Excel to sort card elements, assign relative values, and estimate how cards would perform across repeated plays. Tardif later wrote that the published game contained 429 unique cards, making intuition alone insufficient for balancing the full range of interactions and scoring combinations.

The game's visual design relied on photography rather than a single illustrator for most card faces. Tardif wanted real photographs because actual specimens best suited the theme, but sourcing and verifying a large image library from online photo banks became a major production task. The published game credits M81 Studio, Conor McGoey, Yulia Sozonik, and Kenneth Spond for artwork.

Tardif first met publisher Conor McGoey of Inside Up Games at Gen Con in 2017, when both were early in their publishing experience, and the two stayed in contact afterward. When the prototype was ready to show publishers, Tardif chose Inside Up in part because a crowdfunding model fit the game's international ambitions. Tardif saw Kickstarter as both a marketing tool and a way to measure interest, gather feedback, and continue refining the design before manufacture.

Inside Up Games launched Earth on Kickstarter in February 2022, and the campaign reached its funding goal within two hours. During the campaign, an online demo on Tabletop Simulator allowed additional players and localization partners to try the game before production.

Earth was released on Earth Day, 22 April 2023. The first English-language print run totaled 25,000 copies, in addition to roughly 6,000 to 7,000 copies needed for Kickstarter backers. The game sold through its initial run immediately, prompting a 10,000-copy mini-reprint and plans for further printings.

== Gameplay ==
In Earth, players compete to create the highest-scoring ecosystem by building a 4-by-4 tableau of cards that represents an island filled with plants, terrain, and environmental features. Rather than racing on a board or attacking opponents directly, players try to assemble the most efficient combination of cards, powers, and scoring conditions by the end of the game.

Each turn, one player chooses one of four actions - planting, composting, watering, or growing - and all players gain the corresponding benefit, with the active player receiving the stronger version of that action. This simultaneous structure keeps everyone involved on every turn and is one of the game's defining mechanisms.

Over time, players fill their 4-by-4 tableau by adding cards from hand, generating resources, and activating powers that trigger when cards are played or when later actions are chosen. As more spaces are filled, the tableau functions increasingly like an interconnected ecosystem, with card effects and scoring opportunities compounding across rows, columns, and related card types rather than following a single fixed path.

The game's main resources are soil, sprouts, growth, and composted cards. Soil is spent to play new cards into the tableau, while sprouts and growth are placed on flora cards and later contribute to final scoring; cards moved to the compost pile can also satisfy card requirements and are worth points at the end of the game.

Scoring comes from several sources rather than a single track. Players score the printed victory-point values on many cards, points from growth and sprouts placed on flora, points for cards in compost, points from public and private objectives, and additional end-game bonuses from ecosystem and fauna scoring cards; completing the full 4-by-4 tableau also grants a bonus.

The game also includes a solo mode against Gaia, an automated opponent. In solo play, the game can end either when the player completes the tableau or when Gaia resolves its last card for the second time.

== Expansions and later developments ==
Inside Up Games later released Earth: Abundance, which the publisher describes as the first expansion for the base game. It adds new mechanics, more player interaction, and support for up to six players.

The publisher later promoted Earth: Animal Kingdom as another expansion, adding 36 animals with their own habitat preferences and abilities. Contemporary coverage of that release also described the Disasters Module as an optional smaller add-on intended to introduce more negative interaction.

== Critical reception ==
Reviews commonly praised Earth for turning a large deck and many scoring avenues into a fast-moving engine-builder. Critics highlighted its simultaneous-action structure for keeping downtime low, the breadth of card combinations available in the tableau, and the strategic depth created by its layered resource conversions and scoring systems.

Recurring criticism centered on the game's low direct interaction and high cognitive load. Reviewers described it as close to a multiplayer solitaire experience, argued that the constant activity leaves little room for table talk, and noted that the abundance of options can be overwhelming even when the overall rules are straightforward.

Coverage often positioned Earth in relation to Wingspan, generally treating it as a denser and more systems-heavy take on a nature-themed engine-builder. Reviewers making the comparison tended to praise its greater variety and deeper card synergies, while also noting that those same qualities made it a less relaxed, more demanding game.

== Awards and honours ==
Earth won both the judges' award and the people's choice award for Best Board Game (European Style) at the 2023 UK Games Expo. It also won the 2023 Solo Award at the International Gamers Awards.
