= Philippine Game Festival =

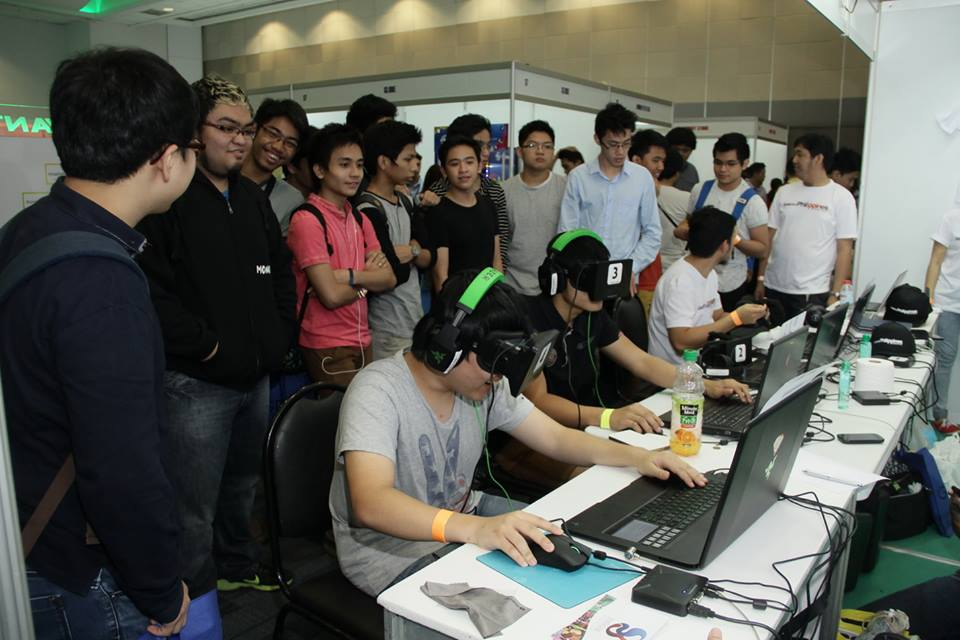
- Participants trying out the Oculus Rift virtual reality headset at PGF 2014
- Status: Active
- Genre: Video Games
- Location: Manila
- Country: Philippines
- Inaugurated: 2009
- Most recent: 2015
- Organizer: Game Developers Association of the Philippines
- Website: http://www.gamefestival.ph/

The Philippine Game Festival, commonly known as PGF, is an annual video game convention held in Manila, the Philippines since 2009. It is usually held in October or November and is organized by the Game Developers Association of the Philippines, the local trade association for the game industry. The gaming convention is the largest gathering of game enthusiasts, designers, and developers in the entire local game development industry. The convention also features two sub-events: the Game On Challenge, an annual game development competition for students, and the PGF Annual Awards, a ceremony recognizing the country's best developers and the games made throughout the year. The most recent Philippine Game Festival took place at the Alpha Tents in Makati last October 2015.
