= Norbreck Castle Hotel =

Hotel in Blackpool, Lancashire, England

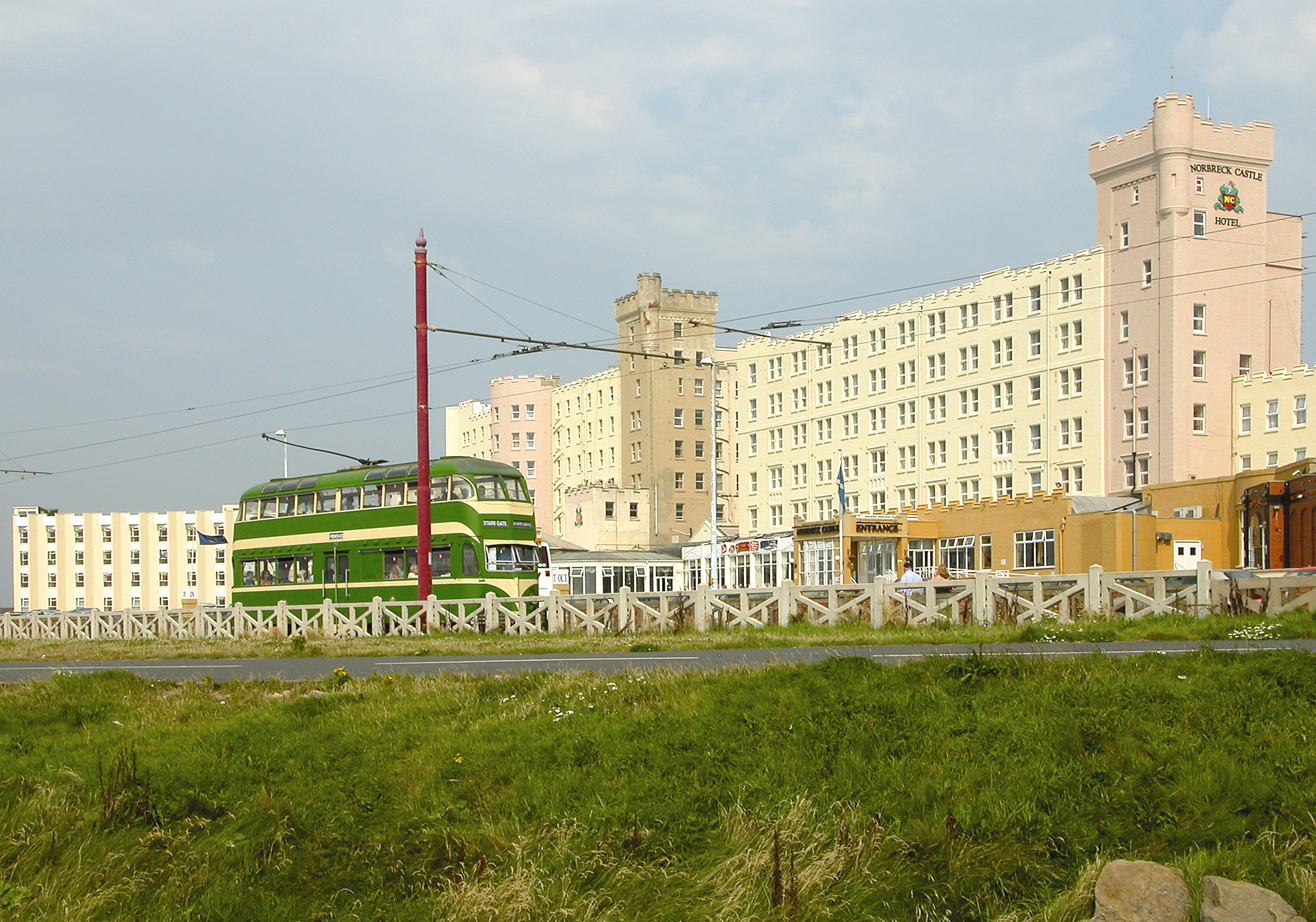
- Heritage tram passing the front elevation

- Location in Blackpool Location in Lancashire

General information
- Location: Blackpool, Lancashire, England
- Coordinates: 53.8582°N 3.0497°W
- Management: Britannia Hotels

Other information
- Number of rooms: 487
- Number of restaurants: 2
- Parking: 800

Website
- Official website

Norbreck Castle Hotel is a large seafront hotel on Queens Promenade, in the Norbreck area of Blackpool, Lancashire, England. The hotel has 480 bedrooms and 22 conference suites, including the Norcalympia Conference Centre.

== History ==
Originally built as a large private country house in 1869, it was bought around the end of the 19th century by J. H. Shorrocks who used the house to entertain friends and colleagues at lavish weekend parties. The popularity of these parties led to Shorrocks running them on a commercial basis by taking paying guests.

In 1912, Shorrocks formed a public company and expanded the building, now named the Norbreck Hydro, in several phases, adding a ballroom, swimming pool and solarium in the early 1930s. By then the Hydro was patronised by nobility and the British upper class, in addition to being a venue for the top stars of stage, screen and radio.

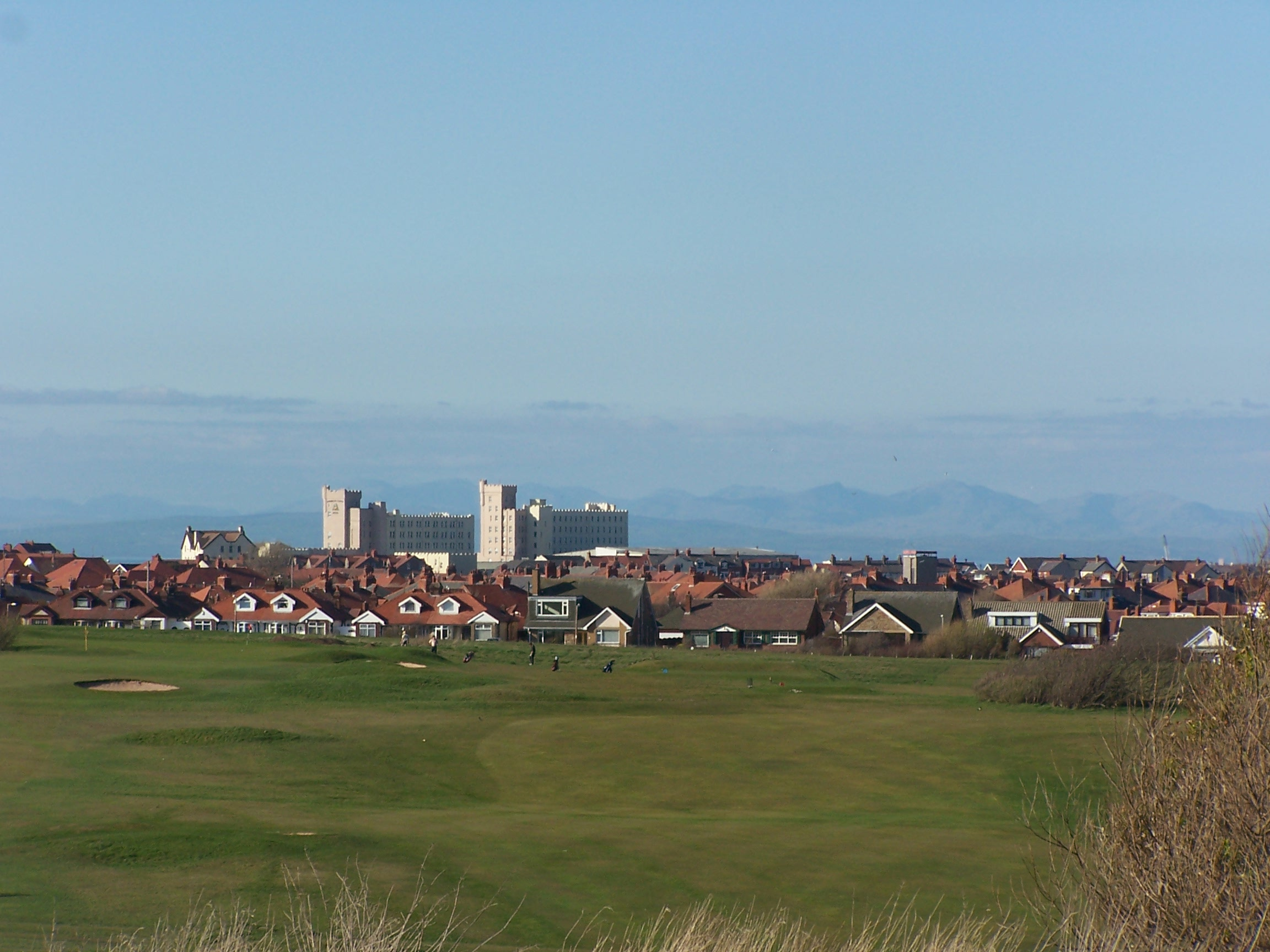
View from North Shore Golf Course, Bispham with the hills of the Lake District in the background and Norbreck Castle Hotel

During World War II the hotel was commandeered by the British government as offices and accommodation for evacuated civil servants. The hotel remained under government control for eleven years until being handed back in 1951. At that time the hotel had - open-air parking for 250 cars, five tennis courts, an 18-hole golf course, a bowling green, a 600-seat restaurant, a ballroom which when used for conferences seated 850, a second smaller ballroom for private parties, two cocktail bars, a swimming pool and 400 bedrooms, 97 of which had private bathrooms.

In the late 1970s, the hotel's disco became the venue for a number of concerts by punk rock, new wave and mod revival bands. Those who played there included the Angelic Upstarts, Penetration and the Purple Hearts. The venue also saw gigs by two bands before they became famous. Adam and the Ants performed there when they were still a punk rock band in March 1979, a performance which One Way System drummer Dave Brown, listed in his top five gigs. And on 15 March 1979, The Pretenders played one of their first ever gigs at the Norbreck. Rock bands starting their careers on tour included Iron Maiden, Def Leppard and the first solo appearance of Ozzy Osbourne after leaving Black Sabbath. The American band The Stray Cats, who had moderate chart success 1980/81, also played one of their first UK gigs here. They were booed off stage and a fight broke out when the lead singer Brian Setzer spat on the audience. The concert was cancelled when the police arrived.

In 1988, the hotel was the venue for a conference where the Liberal Party and Social Democratic Party merged to form the Liberal Democrats. Writing in the New Statesman about the merger, the writer Jonathan Calder said of the hotel, "Blackpool’s Norbreck Castle Hotel does not lift the spirit at the best of times, and in January 1988 its Soviet ambience was enhanced by the trams and melting snow in the streets outside."

In 2003, a group of fifteen children who had just returned from Hong Kong to study at Rossall School were isolated at the hotel over SARS concerns and were kept in a self-contained wing with a nurse. However, they had to be removed by Rossall School for their safety when hotel guests found out the children were staying there, after the story was leaked to the local press and what was described as an "abusive mob" of hotel guests forced the children to be removed from the hotel.

The hotel is owned and operated by Britannia Hotels, and one of four owned by the group in Blackpool.

== Facilities ==
The hotel contains two restaurants and two bars. The hotel has its own 35 seat cinema and a games room as well as a health and leisure club. The hotel has 22 conference, meeting and banqueting rooms, the largest of which can accommodate 3,000 people.

== Events ==
The Norcalympia is host to a number of events. In November 2001 the BUPA Care Homes Open tournament, an indoor bowls World Bowls Tour competition was held at the venue and filmed live on BBC Two. The venue is also host to the largest annual Elvis Presley contest convention in Europe, the European Elvis Competition. Other events held there include the Blackpool Classic Motorcycle Show, and the Classic snooker tournament between 1987 and 1990. It also hosts the biggest Model Boat show in the UK in October every year, with even a purpose built indoor pool. Play Expo Blackpool has become an annual event too, with thousands of people visiting to play games, including pinball, and listen to talks. The Crystal Boot Awards for linedancing are held there every year and attracts dancers across the globe to the venue.
