= CanGames =

Ottawa gaming convention

- Status: Active
- Genre: Gaming
- Venue: Rideau Curling Club
- Locations: Ottawa, Ontario
- Country: Canada
- Inaugurated: 1977
- Website: www.cangames.ca

CanGames is an annual gaming convention that has taken place in Ottawa, Ontario, Canada, since 1977. It occurs every year on the Canadian May (Victoria Day) long weekend.

== Scheduling and location ==
Although the show is now held on the Canadian Victoria Day weekend, the first show was held on the Canada Day weekend instead. Generally the show runs from Friday through Sunday night. The show has been held in a number of locations, including the Carleton University campus. Currently the Rideau Curling Club hosts the event.

== Features of the show ==
CanGames features gaming (Board, Miniatures, RPG) in both English and French and offers trophies to winners.

The convention was originally conceived, organized, and continues to be run by a committee of volunteers.

== The CanGames Dwarf ==
The original CanGames Dwarf was designed by Denis Beauvais, a noted Fantasy artist whose work has appeared in Dragon Magazine, science fiction novel covers and in various video and boardgames.

Currently the trophies are a sculpted dwarf done by Sandra Garrity, a noted fantasy figure sculptor.

== Format of the show ==
The format of the show has varied over the years, although the core activities of RPGs, miniature games and boardgames have featured each year.

In the early years the show included seminars and featured guests from the gaming industry, including such as Frank Chadwick of GDW, Jim Dunnigan of SPI, Gary Gygax of TSR and John Hill of Avalon Hill. Canadian game designer Steve Newberg of SimulationsCanada was a frequent guest. Early shows also featured film showings and auctions.

In later years the elements of the show have varied to reflect changing tastes in gaming, including the addition of CCGs to the featured games. Miniatures painting competitions have also been part of the show. Youth games have been added to encourage a new generation of gamers.

== CanGames favorites ==
CanGames features several games that run every year. Chariots is a homegrown game that recreates the excitement of the Ben Hur chariot race. The Rubberboots saga is an "Indiana Jones"-style serial revolving around the recurring character of a Gumshoe detective featuring captivating scale-model sets. There is a thriving dealers area that is part of the main convention floor. There is also a consignment sale where attendees can drop off their sale items and the CanGames staff will sell them for a 15% commission.

== Coverage of the show ==
CanGames was reported on by Dragon magazine in 1979 and 1980 and by local Ottawa newspaper Orleans Now in 2007

In 2011 it was featured on the front page of the Ottawa Citizen and the Citizen website included a picture and a short interview of one of the attendees.
