= Ziggurat Con =

Role-playing convention in 2007

- Status: Defunct
- Genre: Role-playing video game
- Locations: Ali Air Base and Camp Adder, Nasiriyah
- Country: Iraq
- Inaugurated: 2007
- Attendance: 30 +/-
- Organizer: United States Army

Ziggurat Con was a role-playing convention held on June 10, 2007. It was remarkable for being the only known role-playing gaming convention held in a warzone. The con was held on the grounds of the Ali Airbase and Camp Adder in Iraq during the Iraq War, both housing large numbers of United States Department of Defense personnel. It was named after a ziggurat from the ancient city of Ur that is on the base grounds. Admission was free to all U.S.-allied military personnel and civilian contractors posted in Iraq.

== History ==
Ziggurat Con was as a soldier-run event. The convention was organized by active duty military service personnel deployed to Iraq by the United States Armed Forces, and by contractors to the United States government. It was originally scheduled for June 9, but was moved to the 10th to help preserve operational security.

Part of the base's Community Activity Center hosted the convention. The Memorial Theater showed anime, the ping pong room and mini-theater held pen-and-paper role-playing games, and role-playing video games were held in the console gaming room at the MWR Activity Center. The convention's first organizer was Convention Chair SPC David Amberson. SPC Amberson is looking for someone who will take the reins and hold a second Ziggurat Con, and has a couple of prospects already.

SPC Amberson noted that a distinct lack of morale was plaguing the troops stationed in Iraq. This was especially true after troops first heard about the three-month extension over the news or from family members as early as two weeks prior to announcements by their own chain of command. To help combat this low morale, Amberson organized the friends he played Dungeons & Dragons with regularly and scheduled a convention to give games, dice, and other goodies to the troops he was stationed with.

As there are no stores near the base where these games can be bought, Ziggurat Con was dependent upon private sponsorship and internet orders. Game manufacturers and private individuals donated supplies, including rule books and dice. A number of groups formed in the United States to collect and ship gaming supplies for the convention. Operation Dice Drop in Oregon is one such group. The ultimate goal of the Con was to give every coalition service member and civilian contractor in attendance at least one item to take home and keep. This was achieved quite easily, and many soldiers even took boxes of goodies with them to their individual living areas.
