= PrinceCon =

- Status: Active
- Genre: roleplaying games
- Venue: Campus Club
- Locations: Princeton, New Jersey
- Country: United States
- Inaugurated: 1976
- Organizer: Simulation Games Union (SGU)
- Website: http://www.princecon.org

PrinceCon, held annually since 1976 on the campus of Princeton University in New Jersey is one of the oldest fantasy role-playing game conventions in the United States and is responsible for the introduction of the super-dungeon role-playing marathon format.

== History and background ==
The first PrinceCon convention was run in 1976 under the direction of Howard Mahler. It introduced the concept of a super-dungeon where multiple game masters led players on adventures into the same interconnected dungeon. The dense, 46-hour, non-stop format allowed participants to experience up to seven or eight related adventures in a single weekend. Each adventure followed a central theme and worked towards a carefully orchestrated climactic resolution on the final day of play, simulating the experience of a longer role-playing campaign.

In 1978 (PrinceCon III), the convention adopted Mahler's PrinceCon role-playing system, loosely based on Dungeons & Dragons with optimizations for convention play. These optimizations included elements such as a Mage 'Spell Point' system (eliminates the overhead of customized lists of memorized spells) and a similar Clerical 'Prayer Point' system. In 1984 (PrinceCon IX), another extensory refinement was the introduction of Clerical religions, where each religion having its own complementary and semi-customized list of Prayers. Over the years, this RPG system diverged from D&D and acquired a following outside of the PrinceCon convention, leading to the introduction of additional guidelines for campaign play. In 2006, it was further adapted to work with the D20 system of role-playing games and was re-released under the Open Gaming License. In 2017 it moved to Dungeons & Dragons 5th edition rules.

After the first few years, the use of a super-dungeon was dropped; however, from that concept developed one of the continuing aspects that makes PrinceCon different from other events: a strong meta-theme. All adventures (irrespective of game master) take place in the same "universe" with an overarching plot and goal (which generally results in the events of individual adventures having con-wide effect and players in different parties collaborating over the span of the convention). Generally the meta-theme and game universe are different every year (however PrinceCons 29 through 31 were a trilogy with a continuing plot that spanned all three conventions).

Another noteworthy aspect of PrinceCon, since its conception, is how characters are managed. Instead of being assigned characters by each individual game master for the duration of an adventure, players are allowed to create a character at the beginning of the convention that they keep throughout their stay (barring in-game death), gaining experience, collecting magic items and leveling up as the story progresses between adventures, which is generally more representative of campaign play.

== Interesting facts ==
In a 2001 interview, Skaff Elias a Game Designer for Wizards of the Coast, and author of the Miniatures Handbook (Dungeons & Dragons Supplement) when asked, said that his favorite miniatures engagement was a series of battles he experienced at PrinceCon.
