= Lisboa Games Week =

Video game trade fair in Portugal

- Status: Active
- Genre: Video games
- Venue: FIL Exhibition Centre
- Location: Lisbon
- Coordinates: 38.769°N 9.094°W
- Country: Portugal
- Inaugurated: 6 November 2014; 11 years ago
- Most recent: 26 November 2023; 2 years ago
- Attendance: 55,286 (2017)
- Organizer: Fundação AIP; DGE/ERTE
- Website: lisboagamesweek.pt

Lisboa Games Week, or simply LGW, is a trade fair for video games held annually at the FIL Exhibition Centre in Lisbon, Portugal. It is organised by FIL - International Fair of Lisbon ) with the approval of Portuguese Ministry of Education (Direcção Geral de Educação - Equipa de Recursos e Tecnologias Educativas).

== Dates ==
Year	Dates	Venue	Location	Attendance
2014	6–9 November	FIL Exhibition Centre	Lisbon	50,000
2015	5–8 November	FIL Exhibition Centre	Lisbon	40,000
2016	17–20 November	FIL Exhibition Centre	Lisbon	48,000
2017	16–19 November	FIL Exhibition Centre	Lisbon	55.286
2018	15–18 November	FIL Exhibition Centre	Lisbon	60.000
2019	21–24 November	FIL Exhibition Centre	Lisbon	63.000
2022	17–20 November	FIL Exhibition Centre	Lisbon	34.000 (unique visitors)
2023	23–26 November	FIL Exhibition Centre	Lisbon	
