= Northern Lights Pinball Show =

Annual pinball convention in England

- Genre: Pinball Show
- Begins: 4 May 10:00am
- Ends: 5 May 6:00pm
- Frequency: Annually
- Location: Manchester Central
- Years active: 8
- Inaugurated: 5 November 2011
- Most recent: 24 October 2021
- Attendance: 30,000
- Area: Manchester, England
- Website: http://www.ukpinball.com

The Northern Lights Pinball show is an annual event that takes place in the North West of England and most commonly runs as part of Play Expo Manchester. The show is intended to raise awareness of pinball by introducing it to a new generation of young players, and is run by a non-profit volunteer led group that donates funds raised by the show to charitable causes. To date, the group has raised over £30,000 for a variety of charities.

== History ==
In the summer of 2010 Dave Moore of Replay Events Ltd. approached Nigel Lunt to discuss plans for a new retro gaming convention named 'R3PLAY'. Nigel was tasked with gathering a collection of pinball machines for the show, and a number of people from the North of England volunteered machines from their private collections.

=== R3PLAY ===
The inaugural R3PLAY show took place over the weekend of 6/7 November 2010 at the Norbreck Castle Hotel in Blackpool. The popularity of the pinball machines, particularly within an audience of classic video-game players, was a surprise to many. Following this, a small committee was formed, tasked with increasing the profile of pinball and introducing the game to a new audience. Nigel Lunt would lead the group, which included Mark Robinson and a handful of volunteers from across the North of England.

=== Northern Lights Pinball Show ===
The first official Northern Lights Pinball Show took place alongside the renamed 'Replay Expo' event on the weekend of 5/6 November 2011, again at the Norbreck Castle Hotel in Blackpool. The show featured 47 pinball machines, and included a display named 'Pinball thru the Ages' showcasing the history of pinball, with electro-mechanical machines from the 1960s, through to modern solid state machines of the 1990s and beyond.

The following year, to accommodate the increase in visitor numbers, the venue was relocated to EventCity Manchester and took place on the weekend of 13/14 October 2012. The parent show was renamed again, to 'Play Expo'. The area allocated to pinball machines was increased, which allowed 78 machines to be set up, including a specially modified Haunted House with a multi-ball feature.

The show in 2013 increased in size again, hosting 122 pinball machines, all on free play. As well as the now familiar NBA Fastbreak competition, the special features included a 'CosPin' cosplay competition, with attendees dressing as their favourite characters from the world of pinball. Martin Ayub of Pinball News also hosted a competition across three pinball machines as a 'Pin Golf' competition, with competitors attempting to achieve objectives against each machine within the fewest balls.

In 2014 the show contained 118 pinball machines over the weekend of 11/12 October. Amongst the highlights were a UK first appearance of The Walking Dead pinball machine. A chance to see the progress on 'Forbidden Planet' by Phil Dixon, and a large collection of Gottlieb machines. A good number of special features appeared, including:

- A visit from Gary Stern (of Stern Pinball inc).
- 'Shoot to Thrill' a competition by the South Coast Slam on AC/DC pinball machines.
- Jim Askey's 'Hacking Lab' showing a number of machines with modified software.
- 'The Fun Zone' with three machines using alternative control methods
- 'Pin Golf' competition hosted by Martin Ayub
- 'EM Challenge' high score competition on classic electro-mechanical machine.

For 2015 the number of machines increased again, with 131 pinball machines available to play. New machines on the Pinball Heaven stand included Whoa Nellie, Kiss, Scoregasm Master, Game of Thrones and Medieval Madness (Remake). Jim Askey's 'Hacking Lab' returned, showing progress on a P-ROC reprogramming of Indiana Jones. Other P-ROC reprogrammed machines at the show were Cactus Canyon Continued, and Bride of Pinbot 2 from Dutch Pinball.

The 'Addams Family Challenge' was a new feature, where players sat in a large 'electric chair' to play The Addams Family. As various events in the game occur, the chair would vibrate the handles, shake the seat or even start smoking. A 'Moose Power' meter and lights on the chair were also synchronised to the in-game sounds. This is a unique, custom built machine, made specially by friends of the Northern Lights group.

2015 also saw the raffle of a new-in-box The Wizard of Oz pinball machine from Jersey Jack Pinball, which helped raise a record amount for charity from the group.

In 2016 the event took place on 8 and 9 October, and featured 121 machines including a large collection of rare Gottliebs

The special feature for the 2017 show which took place on 15 and 16 October 2017, was the 'Play Expo Pinball Battle'. A multi-day pinball tournament, with qualifying across the first two days, and finals on the second day. 82 players competed in what was one of the largest UK tournaments in recent years. The show in 2017 featured 120 pinball machines

== Charitable Work ==
Each year the show runs a series of competitions and other fundraising activities aligned to a pinball theme. Since 2011 The Northern Lights Pinball Show has donated over £30,000 to charitable causes, such as Teenage Cancer Trust.

== NBA Fastbreak Challenge ==
Northern Lights Pinball hold the only NBA Fastbreak Challenge tournament in the world whereby two players go head-to-head on linked NBA Fastbreak machines. This is unique because multiplayer games of pinball are usually turn based, this is the only machine of its kind that can be linked in this way.

=== Rules ===
A maximum of 30 players can participate. The players are split into 6 groups of five players, and face off against each other in a series of four games within each group. The top finisher of each group goes through to the knock-out tournament. When the knock-out stage has finished, the losing two players from the semi-final play against each other to determine the third-place finisher.

=== Gameplay ===
In linked play each player has two minutes, consisting of four 30 second quarters, to score as many points as they can. Ramps, loops and pop bumpers all award points, as well as shooting it into the 'basket' which is in the centre of the upper portion of the table. Both players are awarded the same modes so multiball does not give an advantage to one or the other player. If the game is drawn after full-time, a sudden-death period begins, with the first person to score two points winning. If the ball is in the 'air' when the final whistle blows, it will still count if it goes in, as in real basketball.
