= Gothcon =

Tabletop game convention in Sweden

- Status: Active and running annually
- Genre: Gaming
- Venue: Hvitfeldtska gymnasiet
- Location: Gothenburg, Sweden
- Country: Sweden
- Inaugurated: 1977
- Most recent: 2026
- Attendance: 2,000 in 2014
- Organizer: Föreningen GothCon
- Website: www.gothcon.se/en/

Gothcon is an annual gaming convention in Gothenburg, Sweden, with focus on role-playing games, board games, live action role-playing games, miniature wargaming, wargames and collectible card games. In 2014 the convention was attended by over 2000 people.

The convention has been held on the long weekend of Easter since 1977, with the exception of 2020, when it was cancelled because of COVID-19. This makes it the oldest annually running gaming convention in the Nordic countries. Since 1994 the event has been held at Hvitfeldtska gymnasiet.

The convention is run by the Föreningen GothCon, a non-profit organisation whose sole purpose is to organise GothCon every year. The activities at the convention are organised and managed by external parties, ranging from individuals to various gaming companies.

== History ==
GothCon was started in 1977 by Arne Husberg and H.G. Wessberg under the name KONVENT'77. The first year, the convention had 20-30 visitors and was held at the Student Union. Wargames and miniature war gaming dominated, but there were also opportunities to try role-playing games like Dungeons & Dragons as well as an introduction to Go on the schedule.

For the next year's KONVENT'78, 30 people attended. Dungeons & Dragons made its debut with a brand-new Monster Manual, and attendees could also try playing computer games on a Commodore PET.

In 1980, the name was changed to GothCon.
