= Hanne Bingle =

Danish-born women's rights activist

Hanne Kjer Nyboe Bingle MBE
- Born: 1958 (age 67–68); Denmark
- Occupations: Transport for London driver (2001–2014); Powerlifter (2008–)

Hanne Kjer Nyboe Bingle MBE (born 1958) is a Danish-born women's rights activist, former London Underground driver, and powerlifter. In 2017, she was included on the BBC's 100 Women list of most influential women.

== Personal life ==
Hanne Bingle was born in Denmark, and moved to the United Kingdom in the 1980s. She is married to Ian Bingle, who also worked as a London Underground driver.

== Career ==
=== Train driver ===
Bingle joined Transport for London in 1998, where she worked as a Customer Services Assistant at Piccadilly Circus tube station. She trained as a London Underground driver, and started driving trains on the Victoria line in 2001. She drove trains for TfL for 13 years. During her time with TfL, she participated in the Transport for London women's network. Bingle wanted to address gender imbalance, as at the time, only around 13% of Victoria line drivers were female. In 2009, she received an honorary MBE for services to women's equality and public transport she achieved female toilets being installed. In 2017, she was included on the BBC's 100 Women list of most influential women.

=== Powerlifting career ===
Since 2008, Bingle has competed in professional powerlifting competitions, representing Great Britain. She competed in multiple World Championships between 2008 and 2012. She is also now a National Referee.
