= Dragonflight (convention) =

Three-day gaming convention

Dragonflight (known as Dragonflight GameCon since 2023) is a three-day gaming convention run by a corporation that is also called Dragonflight. It's held over the last weekend of August. The first Dragonflight was in 1980.

== History ==
Dragonflight initially was a creation of members of The Brass Dragon Society, a Seattle role-playing group. Those gamers extended the opportunity to gather at a convention which was to be called Dragonflight. Members of Western Washington Wargamers, an all-facets gaming group, convinced the Brass Dragon Society to embrace all gaming in the convention and joined in the effort to create the first Dragonflight in 1980. Eventually they formed a non-profit organization and Seattle University became the home of the annual convention for nearly twenty-five years. Some thirty years after its founding, the convention moved to a spacious Bellevue hotel. During that time, many area gaming organizations, companies, and individuals have contributed as volunteers to make the convention a success. Every year, gamers forge new friendships, enjoy the camaraderie of fellow enthusiasts, peruse the diverse wares of local vendors, and play countless games.

In 1990, a group of Dragonflight members approached the board of directors with a proposal to join with the Simulation Gaming Association, a campus gaming group at the University of Washington, to create Metro Seattle Gamers, a gaming experience, which is one of the nation's few self-supporting clubhouses devoted to the hobby. The club site remained in the Ballard area of Seattle until 2007. It has since moved to the northern edge of the Queen Anne district.

== Features and Events ==
- Role-playing games
- Miniatures Games
- LARPs
- Board Games
- Card Games, including collectible card games and dedicated deck card games
- Other Games
- Games for Kids
- Dealer's Room
