= NINXA =

Multi-genre entertainment convention in Bahrain

- Formation: March 15, 2007; 19 years ago
- Type: Privately held company
- Official language: Arabic, English
- Key people: Ahmed Alkooheji
- Parent organization: Louard van Koulde Group
- Subsidiaries: Ninxa Otaku, Ninxa Orion, Ninxa Optimal, Ninxa Omega
- Staff: 4 (2011)
- Volunteers: 54 (2014)
- Website: ninxa.one
- Formerly called: Ninxa Otaku

Ninxa is a youth funded private organization in Bahrain founded to cater and promote the majority needs of Japanese animation (anime), Japanese graphic novels (manga), related gaming, as well as Japanese and Western pop-culture (music, cinema, television) fans in the Kingdom of Bahrain and the surrounding region. Ninxa holds events annually during a Friday.

NINXA made efforts since 2007 to organize events/gatherings and continue giving more in the 'otaku' scene and has received encouragement from several official bodies among them the Japanese Embassy, American Embassy delegates, and plaudit by over 25,000 fans. The name "Ninxa" is a word found in the fictional High QuRab language and also related to the Arch Lords novel where a planet is called Ninax. The first event was held in 2011 by the end of June.

== History ==
The sole purpose was to build gathering for fans of the same interests that are anime, manga, video games, cosplay, and generally pop-culture. Earlier, organized solely by Ahmed Alkooheji, brand name Ninxa bared the representation of a beacon of pop-culture interest within the kingdom and its surrounding countries.

== Otaku Drive ==
NINXA follow a combination of visions and missions that it calls Otaku Drive:

- We aim to create event/gatherings for all ages to enjoy by several of interactive activities and competitions. In addition, we want to gather all interested parties of Japanese animation (anime), comics (manga) and video game enthusiasts to create a memorable day for all to enjoy.
- We aspire to expand knowledge about Japanese Culture and History by gathering fans with different interest to share and acquire new interests.
- We seek to become a vehicle of sharing and disseminating industry of information by becoming the central event for those fans.
- We act as a creative outlet for fans, an occasion where they can show their passion and appreciation of the hobby.
- We are an event where fans can show off the costumes they have made, the music videos they have created, and the art they have painted and drawn.
- We aim to have our gatherings as forums for discussion and education as educational panels introducing others to the Japanese culture and the anime history.

== Events ==
NINXA develops and manages various projects and properties that are used to accomplish the mission and vision of the organization.

=== BANICON ===
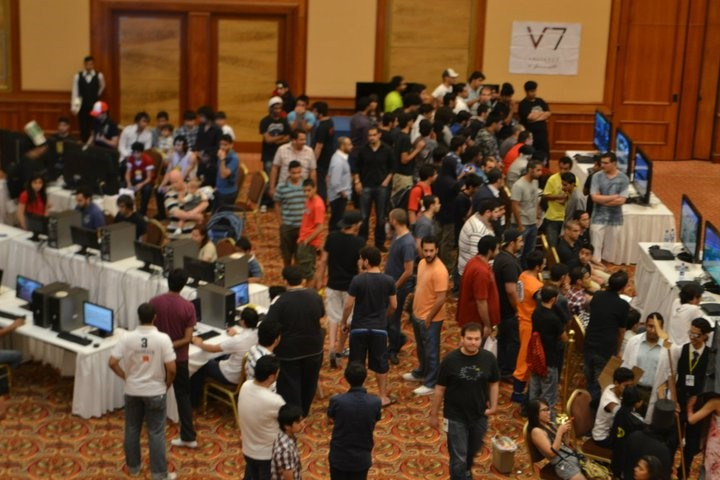
Attendees and Gamers at the Gamers Realm of Banicon 2011

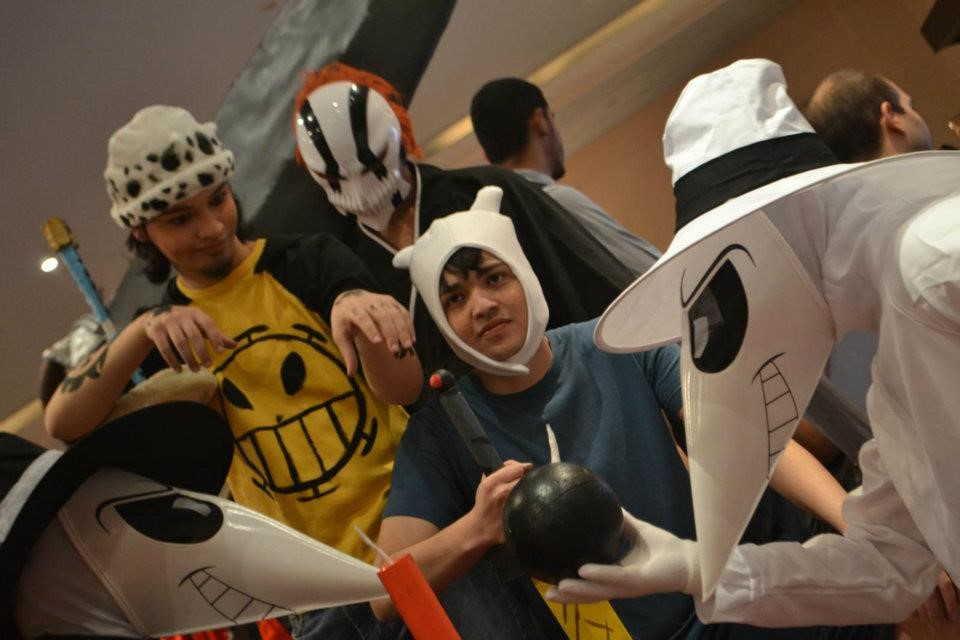
Cosplayers at the First Summoning

Bahrain Anime Convention, or BANICON for short. It was organized under the patronage of "Hind 0.2" and whiteness the presence of speakers, participants and delegates from the GCC and partly the world. The event's program held: Gaming Realm, Cosplaying, Artists Alley, Screening Theater, History, Contests, Trivia Show, and Merchants from Saudi Arabia, Dubai, Qatar and Bahrain.

Dates	Location	Attendance	Guests
30 June 2011	Gulf Convention Centre; Manama, Bahrain	863 (713 registered)	Yousif Alsaleise

=== The First Summoning ===
The First Summoning, by Ninxa Otaku, was a brand new anime pop-culture hybrid event that compacted to a 'summoning'. The gathering attracted anime, manga, and gaming fans within the Persian Gulf region. A first in gathering all event organisers, online related establishments, and merchants under one roof. The event was a great success and over 95% of acceptance rate and demand for more. The event combined the previous associates into one gathering.

Dates	Location	Attendance	Guests
23 March 2012	Best Western Hotel; Manama, Bahrain	980	

=== AFK ===
The AFK Phenomena, a new title for a new brand of events. The Event attracted many fans from around the Persian Gulf region, the foreign residents (US, Europe), and a variety of press from Saudi Arabia, Kuwait, UAE. Purposing having the event before the starting of school semester had an impact in attendance and enjoyment of various activities such as dedicating 45% of the hall for PS3/PC Tournaments. A flooded market of merchants, screening of movies, cosplay competition, AMV competition, and other demanded activities.

Dates	Location	Attendance	Guests
30 August 2013	Media Centre, Bahrain International Circuit; Sakhir, Bahrain	1,023	Saud Al Hazzani
9 January 2015	Media Centre, Bahrain International Circuit; Sakhir, Bahrain	1,200+	Saud Al Hazzani

=== SaikoroWars ===
'Saikoro', Dice in Japanese and 'Wars' was the event's brand for its introduction of tabletop and board games in the region.

The main aim of the event was to have the fans busy all day long with the variety of activities, games, and contests that was collectively gathered on one condition, the enjoyment of the fans. "Whether you're a fan of Anime, wearing Costumes, playing Arcades, or Tabletop games; we got you covered. Our Anime and Cosplay fans are going to face various activities to fulfil their time, and might not want to leave! We scratched the gaming zone and instead installed the addicting competitive Arcade games. This Year we intend to highly focus on Tabletop and Board games, up to 20 different games for your enjoyment and another major 40+ players board game 'Wolverine".

Dates	Location	Attendance	Guests
7 February 2014	Paddock Halls, Bahrain International Circuit; Sakhir, Bahrain	764	Saud Al Hazzani, Greeni, Omar LK
