= Gamers' Day =

Gamers' Day يوم اللاعبين
- Status: Defunct
- Genre: Gaming exhibition
- Date: 2008
- Venue: Riyadh International Convention & Exhibition Center
- Location: Middle East
- Country: Saudi Arabia
- Attendance: 60 000
- Organiser: www.expohorizon.com
- Website: www.gamersday.com

Gamers' Day (Arabic: يوم اللاعبين) was a gaming exhibition held every year in Riyadh, Saudi Arabia. It was one of the largest gaming exhibitions for gamers in Saudi Arabia and around GCC. Gamers' Day started in Saudi Arabia in 2008. Every year it had a high number of visitors and exhibitors. New games are introduced during the exhibition.

== Activities ==
Activities conducted during the exhibition include:

- Upcoming games showcasing
- PS and accessories showcasing
- Stage activities and performers
- Competitions and tournaments
