= Festival Ludique International de Parthenay =

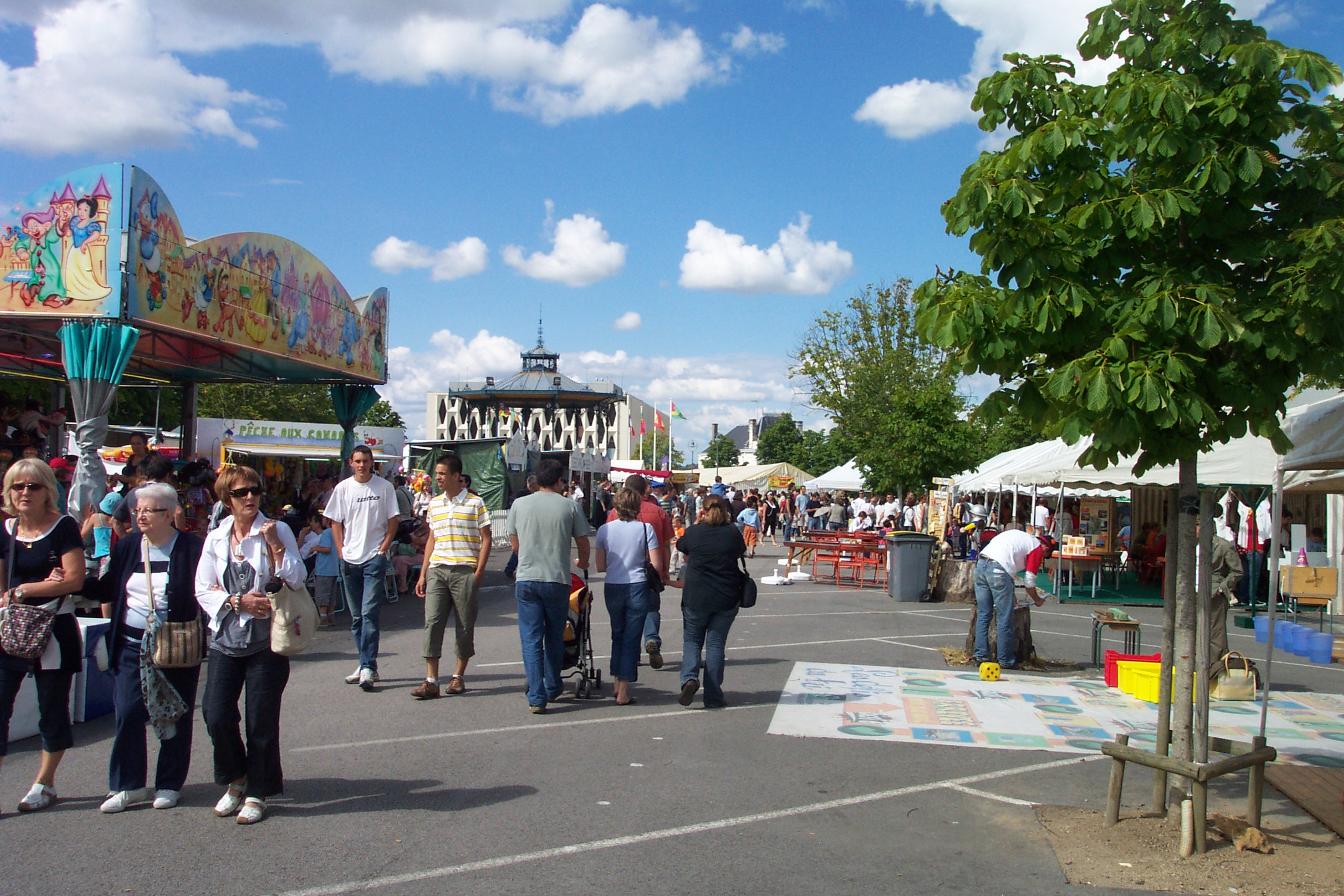
The Place du Drapeau during FLIP 2008.

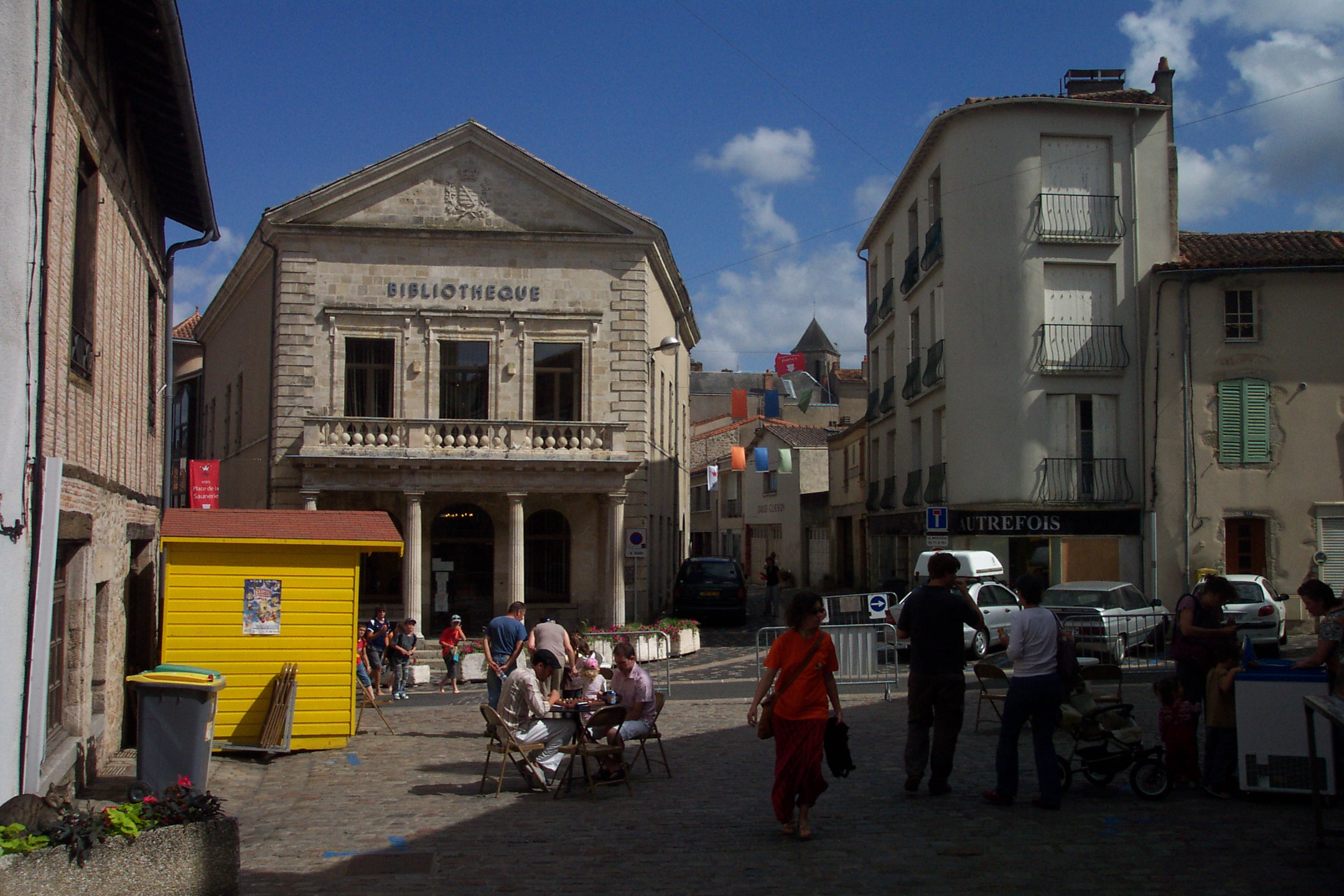
A town centre location during FLIP 2010.

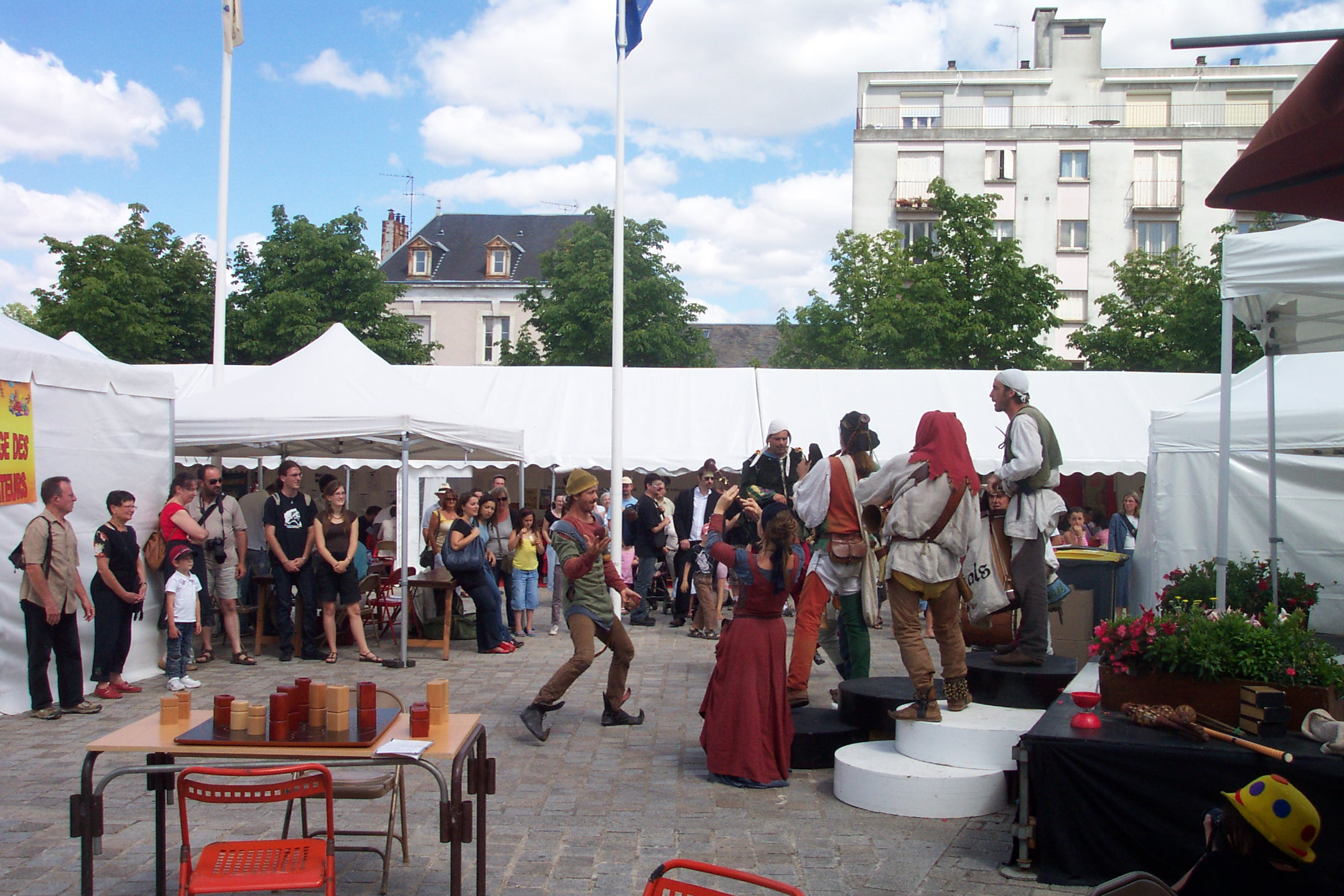
Mediaeval musicians and jugglers entertain the crowds during FLIP 2010.

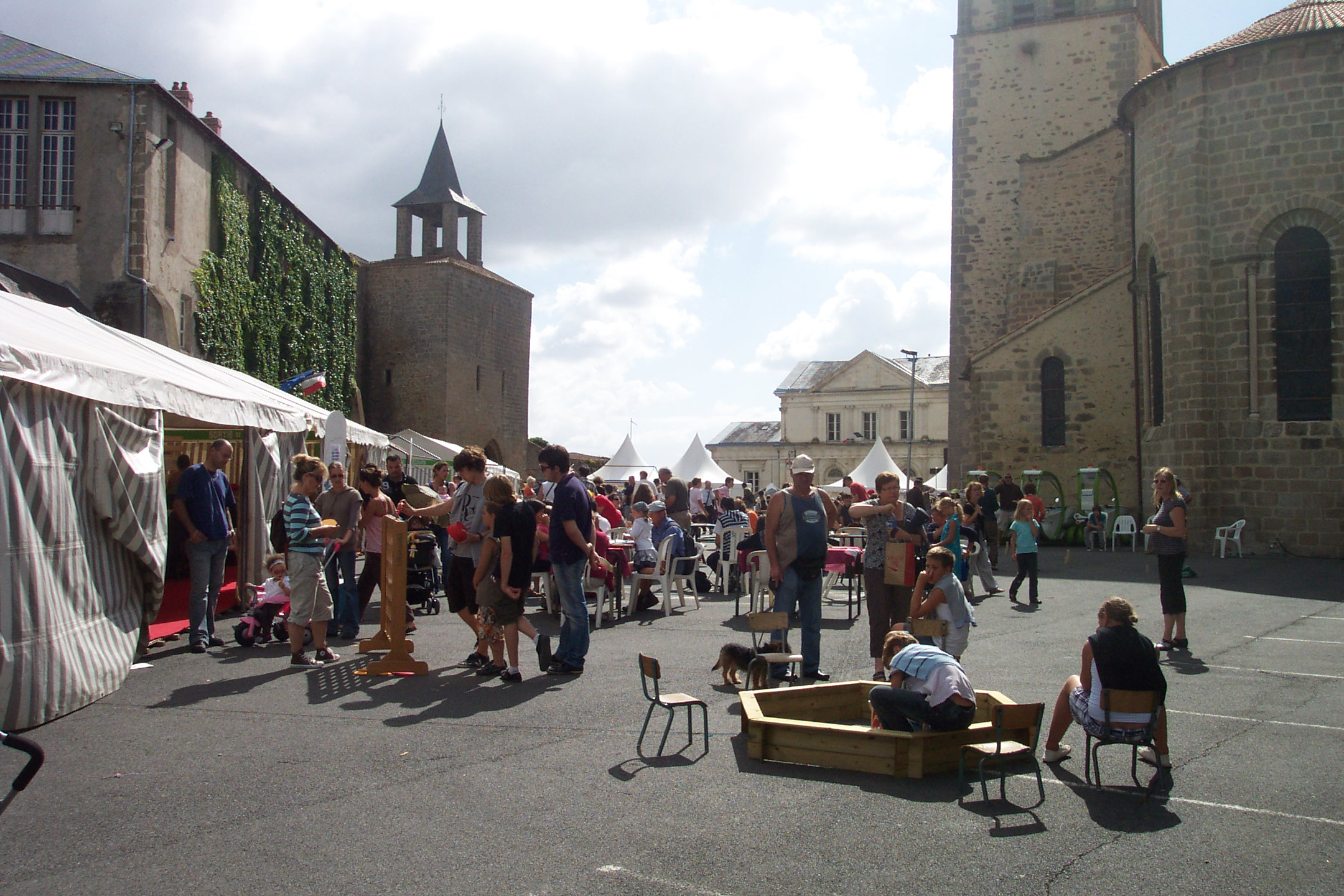
Inside Parthenay's citadel during FLIP 2010

The Festival Ludique International de Parthenay, otherwise known as the Festival de Jeux or FLIP, is a games festival held in the town of Parthenay in western France. The festival is held over a period of 12 days in early July. Most of the festival is held out of doors throughout the streets and squares of the town centre, although some elements are held indoors or under canvas. A shorter indoor version of the festival (FLIP d'hiver) runs in November.

The festival is organised by the communauté de communes of Parthenay, with the support of many different partners and sponsors. The first festival was in 1986. In 2011, it ran from 6 to 17 July.

No festival was held in 2020.

== Villages ==
Traditionally, the festival is divided into a number of themed 'Villages' spread throughout Parthenay. For example, in 2008, the festival comprised the following villages:

- Village des Créateurs
- Village des Jeux
- Village des Jeux et Environnement
- Village des Jeux Sportifs
- Village des Jouets
- Village des Jeux Médiévaux
- Village Multimédia
- Village Récréatif
- Village des Jeux de Simulation
- Village des Jeux Traditionnels

In addition to the themed villages, various board games are left scattered throughout the town's shopping streets. The town's congress hall holds a computer games fair, and various organised team games are held in the Place du Drapeau. --
