= DunDraCon =

Gaming convention

DunDraCon is a four-day gaming convention run by Dundracon Inc. It is held each Presidents' Day weekend, in Santa Clara, California as of 2022, with open registration and the first games starting on Friday morning, concluding on Monday evening. The first DunDraCon was in 1976; the organization incorporated in 1980.

== History ==
Before 2021 DunDraCon took place in San Ramon, California, as well as Oakland, CA, at least across the 1980s, it is recalled. The first DunDraCon was in 1976, about ten years after the first informal meeting of Gen Con. Nevertheless, DunDraCon is one of the oldest roleplaying game conventions worldwide, and is the longest continuously running gaming convention on the West Coast of the United States, but was not held in 2021 due to the COVID-19 pandemic. Program books are archived from DunDraCon 3 to the most recent convention (DunDraCon 43 as of 2019).

== Features and Events ==
- Role-playing games
- Miniatures Games
- LARPs
- Board Games
- Card Games, including collectible card games and dedicated deck card games
- Other Games
- Seminars
- Demonstrations
- Painting (miniatures)
- Kid's Room
- Society for Creative Anachronism (includes demonstrations and seminars)
- Dealer's Room
