= Zurich Pop Con & Game Show =

Swiss pop-culture convention

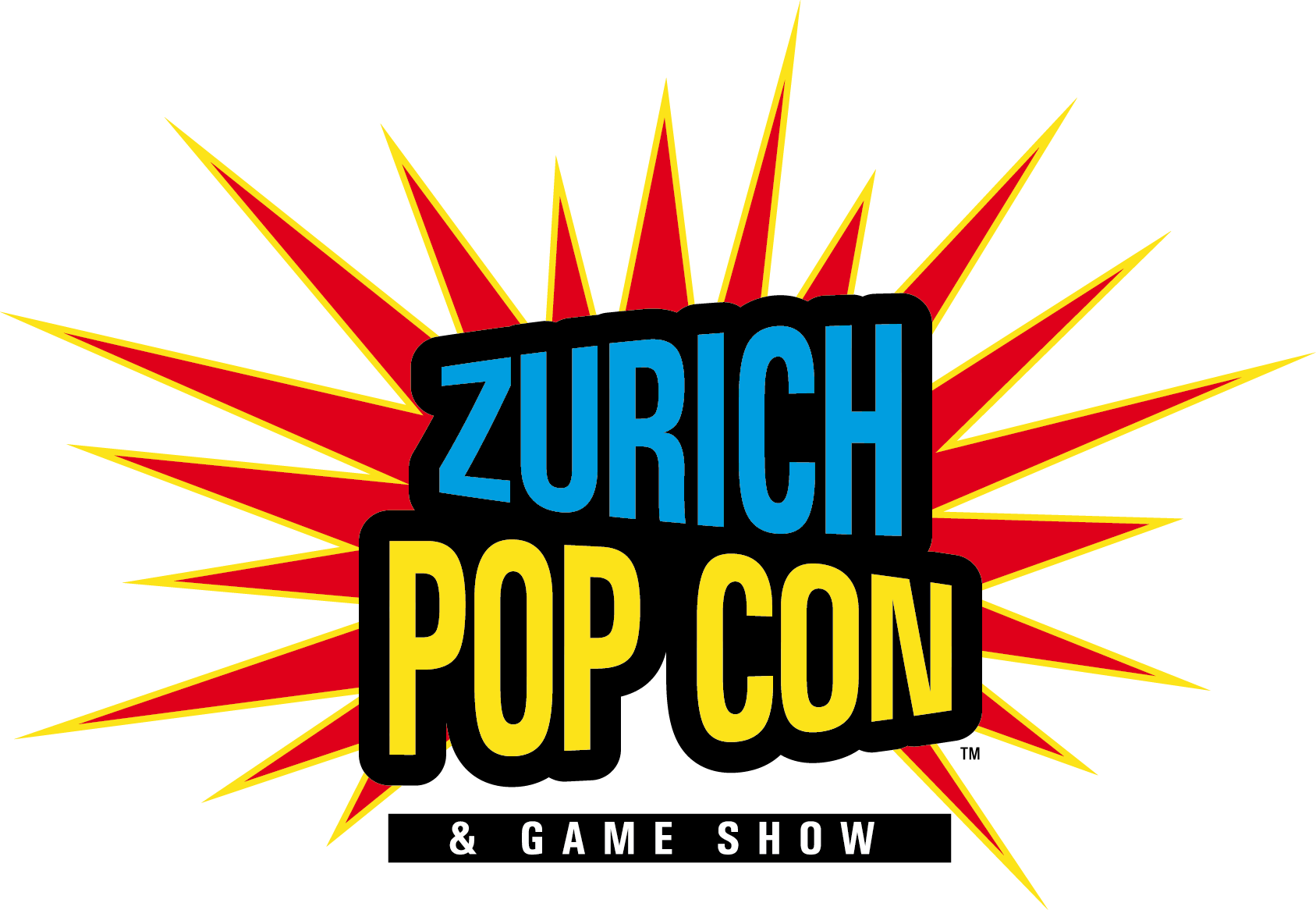
- Status: Active
- Genre: Pop culture, Gaming, Cosplay, Digital Entertainment, Comic, Anime, Manga and K-Pop
- Frequency: Annually
- Venue: Messegelände Zürich|Messe Zürich, Switzerland
- Locations: Zurich, Switzerland
- Previous event: September 26–27, 2026
- Next event: October 2–3, 2027
- Attendance: 48'500
- Website: https://zurichpopcon.ch/en

The Zurich Pop Con & Game Show is a Swiss convention for pop culture, gaming, cosplay, digital entertainment, comics, anime, manga and K-Pop. It was first held in Zurich in 2017 and has been held annually since then - with the exception of the pandemic years 2020 and 2021 - on 30,000 m^{2} of space.

== Organizer and venue ==
The convention was founded by Martin Schorno, the organizer is Amazing Event AG in Zurich. The Zurich Pop Con & Game Show takes place in the halls of Messe Zürich.

== Programme ==
The Zurich Pop Con & Game Show is dedicated to Asian, European and American pop culture. Visitors can try out new computer games, sometimes before the official launch. International e-sports players and teams as well as streamers are taking questions from the audience in panels and compete against each other in tournaments. The gaming zones are supplemented by a cosplay village, where cosplay artists present their costumes. In addition to gaming, the Zurich Pop Con & Game Show also features an area for artists from the fields of urban art, tattoo art, comics and manga, as well as various merchandisers. Contributors to video games, series and films are present as guests at the Zurich Pop Con & Game Show.

== History ==
The Zurich Pop Con & Game Show started in 2017 on 20'000 m^{2} under the name Zurich Game Show as an event for gaming, e-sports, cosplay and board games and attracted 19'000 visitors. The event was supported by the gaming industry and the gaming and e-sports community. In attendance were brands such as HP, Sony PlayStation and Nintendo, as well as national and international e-sports teams and players. In addition, four e-sports tournaments (Overwatch, League of Legends, Counter-Strike: Global Offensive and Rocket League) were held within the event. In 2018, the event was increased in area from six to seven halls and thus to 30,000 m^{2}. Due to the COVID-19 pandemic, the Zurich Game Show was held virtually in 2020.

This was followed in 2022 by an addition and expansion of the offering to include Asian pop culture, beauty, anime, manga, art, merchandise and food, and thus the change of name to Zurich Pop Con & Game Show.

== Convention statistics ==
Year	Period	Visitors	Exhibition space	Sources
2017	20.10.2017 – 22.10.2017	19'000	20'000 m^{2}	
2018	14.09.2018 – 16.09.2018	27'000	30'000 m^{2}	
2019	13.09.2019 – 15.09.2019	34'000	30'000 m^{2}	
2020	25.09.2020 – 27.09.2020	-	virtual	
2021	12.11.2021 – 14.11.2021	-		
2022	01.10.2022 – 02.10.2022	34'000	30'000 m^{2}	
2023	30.09.2023 – 01.10.2023	38'000	30'000 m^{2}	
2024	05.10.2024 – 06.10.2024	43'500	30'000 m^{2}	
2025	27.09.2025 – 28.09.2025	46'000	30'000 m^{2}	
2026	26.09.2026 – 27.09.2026	48'500	30'000 m^{2}	

== Selection of invited guests ==
(Source:)

- Charles Martinet (voice of Mario)
- Lucy Martin (Vikings, Riviera, Prizefighter: The Life of Jem Belcher)
- Clive Standen (Vikings, Warhammer 40k: Space Marine 2, Robin Hood, Doctor Who)
- Sean Gunn (Guardians of the Galaxy, Gilmore Girls)
- Mecia Simson (The Witcher)
- Lourdes Faberes (The Sandman, James Bond 007: No Time to Die, Good Omens)
- Joe Flanigan (Stargate: Atlantis)
- Elsie Bennett and Kaja Chan (Split Fiction)
- Finn Jones (Game of Thrones, Marvel's Iron Fist)
- Tom Wlaschiha (Stranger Things, Game of Thrones)
- Harry Lloyd (Game of Thrones, Arcane, Doctor Who)
- Vincent Regan (One Piece, House of the Dragon, 300, y)
- Dan Fogler (Fantastic Beasts, The Walking Dead, Fanboys, The Offer)
- Alison Sudol (Fantastic Beasts, A Fine Frenzy)
- Vanesu Samunyai (The Sandman)
