= GottaCon =

Gaming convention

- Status: Defunct
- Genre: Gaming
- Venue: Victoria Conference Centre
- Locations: Victoria, British Columbia
- Country: Canada
- Inaugurated: 2009
- Attendance: 1600 in 2013
- Organizer: GottaCon Conventions
- Website: http://www.gottacon.com/

GottaCon was an annual hobby gaming convention hosted directed by Gottacon Conventions, a privately held company founded in November 2008 by Evan Hatch, Carson Upton, and Michael Lum.

Events were held in Victoria, British Columbia, and ran consecutively from 2009 to 2015. It hosted a broad range of tabletop, RPG, console, and PC gaming events, driven by local businesses and gaming organizations, providing residents of Vancouver Island with an opportunity to engage in both open play or sign up for tournament events.

In 2014, the convention was expanded to include presenters from Victoria Video Game CEO Alliance, and the venue was changed from the George R. Pearkes Arena in Saanich, BC, Canada to the Victoria Conference Centre at 720 Douglas St, Victoria, BC, Canada.

The final GottaCon convention took place February 27 through March 1, 2015. In July 2015, Gottacon Conventions founder Evan Hatch sent out an email announcing that GottaCon would not continue for the foreseeable future.
