= Linda M. Bingle =

American game designer

- Occupation: Game designer

Linda M. Bingle is an editor and game designer who has worked primarily on role-playing games.

== Career ==
Linda Bingle and her husband Don Bingle were top-rated players with the RPGA, and Linda was ranked second worldwide in 1991. They were both shareholders in Pacesetter Ltd in the 1980s, and when they founded the company 54°40' Orphyte in 1991, they purchased many of the product rights to games from Pacesetter and all of its backstock.

Her editing contributions to D&D include the Monstrous Compendium Fiend Folio Appendix (1992) and Ruins of Undermountain II: The Deep Levels (1994).
