= Don Bingle =

American novelist (born c. 1954)

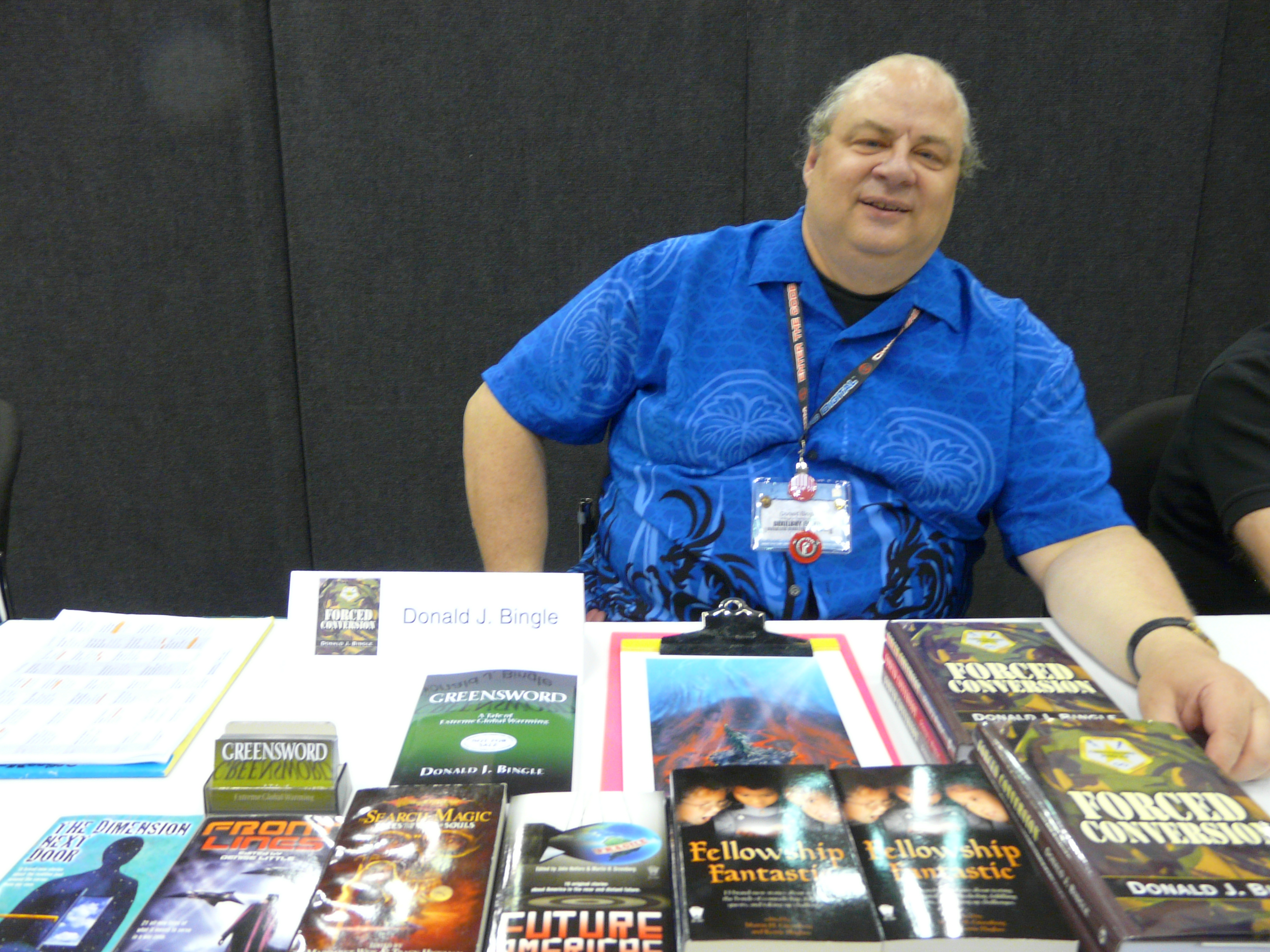
- Born: Donald J. Bingle c. 1954
- Education: University of Chicago
- Occupations: Writer, game designer
- Writing career
- Genre: Role-playing games

Donald J. Bingle (born c. 1954) is a Chicago-area attorney and author originally from Naperville, Illinois.

== Role-playing games ==
Bingle graduated from the University of Chicago. In the late 1980s he was the top-ranked player in the Role-Playing Network, and his wife, Linda, was ranked number two. He is best known as the top-ranked player in the RPGA for most of the 1990s. The Bingles began the company 54°40' Orphyte to publish role-playing books, including two adventures for Time Master, and they also gave some support to the Timemaster line using RPGA tournaments. As of the end of 2004, Bingle had played in 500 tournaments using 50 different game systems.

He has also produced a large body of writing, including contributions to the Forgotten Realms Campaign Setting (2nd Edition), and his novel Forced Conversion, which was released in November 2004 and centers around a futuristic society with the ability to upload people's minds to virtual worlds.

Bingle also authored a number of character-provided events for the RPGA, including "Don't Go There" with Saul Resiknoff, and "The Modern Pirate Game" with Tim White.
