= PrezCon =

- Status: Active
- Genre: Gaming Convention
- Venue: Doubletree Hotel, Charlottesville
- Location: Charlottesville, Virginia
- Country: United States
- Inaugurated: 1994
- Most recent: 2025
- Attendance: 668
- Organizer: Faceless Man Productions
- Website: http://www.prezcon.com/

PrezCon "The Winter Nationals" is a convention held yearly since 1994 by PrezCon, Inc. It is held in Charlottesville, Virginia at the DoubleTree of Charlottesville in late February each year, the starting Monday typically coinciding with the Presidents Day holiday.

PrezCon averages 650+ players each year. The convention was modeled after Avaloncon, which had been run from 1991 to 1998 by Avalon Hill. The convention offers over 100+ board game tournaments, many demos and play tests; plus, 24-hour gaming, live auction of games and related paraphernalia, an auction store, and a vendor's room.

Specific characteristics include:

- 24 hour open gaming area, with library of 500 games, no added cost for all attendees.
- All tournaments may be entered by all attendees with a tournament level badge.
- Junior level open gaming and tournaments for children 12 years or younger for free.
