= Inside the Box Board Games =

British publisher of board games

Inside The Box Board Games LLP
- Company type: Game company
- Founded: 2015
- Founders: Matthew Usher, Peter Blenkharn
- Defunct: 2023
- Headquarters: London, UK

Inside The Box Board Games LLP (operating as ITB) is a defunct British tabletop game publishers formerly based in London, UK.

== History ==
ITB was founded in 2015 by Matthew Usher and Peter Blenkharn while studying at Oxford University. The company's first board game, Molecular, raised over £17,000 on Kickstarter and was released with a limited run of under 600 copies. Usher left the company after their first game and the company continued to be managed by Peter Blenkharn.

In 2017 the company saw success with their third game, Sub Terra, which raised over £350,000 on Kickstarter and was awarded Best Euro Game at the 2017 UK Games Expo

In the subsequent years ITB raised over half a million pounds through Kickstarter for the games Newspeak, CryptX, Sub Terra II, Aquanauts, and Alba. The resulting projects were plagued with delays and mismanagement and most games never materialised. In January 2023 former employees at the company took over the company’s Kickstarter account to announce that they had been dismissed without pay and were owed wages and redundancy pay. Shortly after the announcement ITB officially ceased operation after its creative assets were purchased by Naylor Games.
