= Hellana Games =

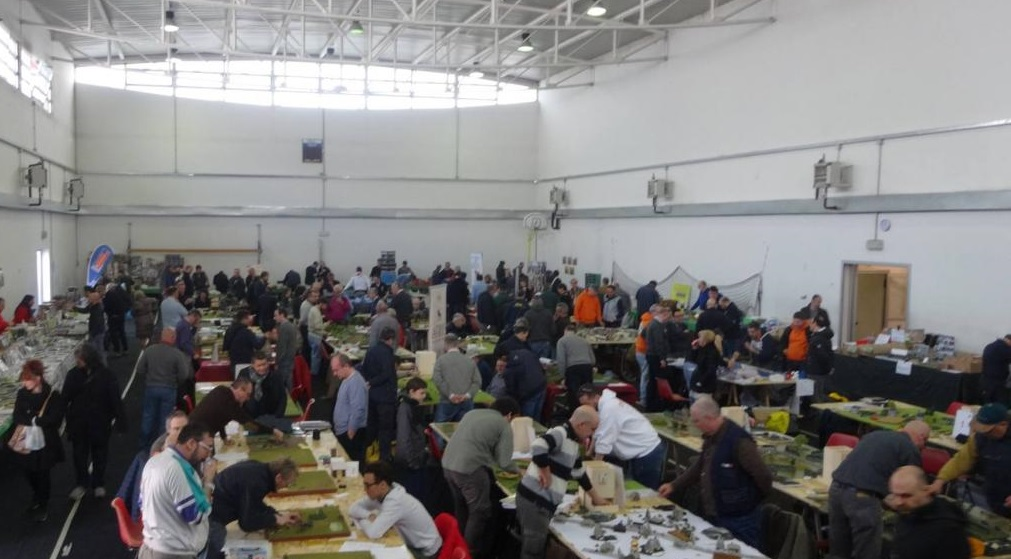
- A Hellana Games pavilion in 2016.
- Status: Active
- Genre: Gaming
- Location: Agliana
- Country: Italy
- Inaugurated: 2001
- Attendance: 2,000 by 2010
- Organizer: Artemide Pictures A.P.S. in collaboration with Gruppo Ludico Aglianese
- Website: hellanagames.it

Hellana Games - Festival of Games and History is an Italian gaming convention organized in Agliana, Tuscany. Considered as one of Italy's longest-running events of its kind, it focuses on the intersection of gaming and history through dedicated demonstrations and activities. The 2010 edition recorded 2,000 attendees.

== History ==
Hellana Games started in 2001.

From 2001 to 2025, it was managed by Gruppo Ludico Aglianese, with a primary focus on exhibiting demonstration tables. Over the years, the event has attracted prominent figures, such as historical and military illustrator Giuseppe Rava, historian Franco Cardini, and Giuseppe Cossiga, former Undersecretary of State for Defence.

Both the 2020 and 2021 editions were canceled due to the COVID-19 pandemic.

From 2026, the organization is entrusted to Artemide Pictures A.P.S., in collaboration with the Gruppo Ludico Aglianese.

Hellana includes board games, tabletop miniature games, and wargames, alongside a dedicated scale modeling section.
