= Strategicon (gaming conventions) =

- Genre: Gaming
- Location: Southern California
- Country: United States
- Attendance: 2,000+
- Website: https://www.strategicon.net/

Strategicon is a series of gaming conventions held in Southern California, focusing on role-playing games, Board Games, card games and miniatures gaming.

There are three annual conventions under the Strategicon banner, each held on a different three-day holiday weekend and running from Friday to Monday:

- Orccon (President's Day weekend, mid-February)
- Gamex (Memorial Day weekend, late May)
- Gateway (Labor Day weekend, late August / early September)

Strategicon events are currently based out of the Hilton Los Angeles Airport Hotel
