= Gaming convention =

Gaming centered convention

A gaming convention is a gathering centered on role-playing games, collectible card games, miniatures wargames, board games, video games, or other types of games. These conventions are typically two or three business days long, and often held at either a university or in a convention center hotel.

The largest gaming convention, Spiel, is a trade fair held in Essen, Germany that focuses on German-style board games and RPGs. Spiel (official name: Internationale Spieltage) is the biggest gaming trade fair with 204,000 people attending from over 80 different countries in 2024. Held in Essen, Germany every October, the convention was fully booked for all four days of the event in 2024 – the first time this has ever happened. A similarly large event is Festival Ludique International de Parthenay (FLIP), a games festival held over twelve days in France. The annual Gamescom in Cologne is the world's leading expo for video games.

While games are often a large part of science fiction conventions and other hobby conventions, gaming conventions are distinguished by focusing on games and game-industry guests. The Penny Arcade Expo is the largest gaming convention in the US, with over 70,000 attendees at both its East (Boston) and Prime (Seattle) events. RPGs are a key focus within this convention which also includes CCGs, miniatures and board games. Originally known as the Lake Geneva Wargames Convention in 1968, this convention was pioneered by Gary Gygax and is currently the largest and longest running tabletop gaming convention within North America. As of 2026, Gen Con has attracted over 74,000 people to Indianapolis, making it the most attended event ever. Origins Game Fair is a miniatures and board game convention run by the Game Manufacturers Association. The event has been held annually in the Greater Columbus Convention Centre, Columbus, Ohio since 1996. Unique attendance in 2024 was 17,706. This represents an increase of greater than 9% compared to 2023, but also has a large component of RPG and CCG players. DragonCon is an example of a large convention with a focus on popular culture and comics that includes a large gaming contingent and 35,000-40,000 attendees, but is not dedicated solely as a gaming convention. A smaller genre of gaming conventions are those devoted to the hobby of historical miniature wargaming, with notable examples including the Hellana Games.

World Boardgaming Championships, PrezCon and Euro Quest are game conventions representing the hobby of Tournament Board Gaming Open Gaming, Demos, Jr. Events and more dedicated to the face to face board game hobby. The World Boardgaming Championships and PrezCon are considered two of the largest events dedicated solely to board games. WBC runs the first week in August each year and PrezCon runs the last week of February each year.

== History ==
=== Early video game conventions ===
A Cincinnati, Ohio duo debuts the first known modern cosplay in 1908. Near the end of the century, cosplay would become a staple at a number of events, including gaming conventions.

== Events ==
Gaming conventions typically have games scheduled for various time slots. Most gaming cons use some system of pre-registration to ensure that games are neither over-full nor under-full.

Competitive games, such as Magic: The Gathering, typically have tournaments set out where players meet in matches. Prizes can be quite large for the winners. There are also competitive role-playing games, where the best roleplayers, most successful parties, etc. get rewarded. The RPGA runs competitive Dungeons & Dragons and other RPGs at many conventions. Most scheduled RPGs, however, are not competitive.

The types of games often include many of the following:

- Collectible Card Games (CCGs), like Magic: The Gathering and Pokémon
- Board games
- Role-playing games (RPGs), like Dungeons & Dragons, Pathfinder, Shadowrun, and Traveller
- RPGA games
- Table-top miniatures games like Battletech, HeroClix, Car Wars, Flames of War and Warhammer 40k
- LARPs
- Electronic games

Open gaming goes on throughout any such convention, and it is common that all seating in common areas will be taken by people playing pick-up games. Pick-up gaming is not generally discouraged by the convention management; in fact, pick-up games are a large part of the appeal of gaming conventions.

Most gaming conventions feature an exhibition hall or dealers' room where publishers, manufacturers, and independent retailers sell games and related merchandise. Publishers frequently use major conventions to announce, demonstrate, or launch new titles. While positive reception and word-of-mouth at these events can generate commercial interest, poor initial impressions among attendees can also negatively affect a game's market prospects.

Often there are other activities at a gaming convention as well. Costume balls, art auctions, and screenings of movies may all take place. Lectures, workshops, or panel discussions on gaming might be part of the programming, or for some cons, even the focus.

== See also ==
- List of gaming conventions
