= List of fan conventions by date of founding =

The list of modern fan conventions for various genres of entertainment extends to the first conventions held in the 1930s.

Some fan historians claim that the 1936 Philadelphia Science Fiction Conference, a.k.a. Philcon, was the first science fiction convention ever held. Others, such as Fred Patten and Rob Hansen, make this claim for the January 1937 event in Leeds, England, organized by the Leeds Science Fiction League, which was specifically organized as a conference, with a program and speakers. Out of this came the first incarnation of the British Science Fiction Association.

While a few conventions were created in various parts of the world within the period between 1935 and 1960, the number of convention establishments increased slightly in the 1960s and then increased dramatically in the 1970s, with many of the largest conventions in the modern era being established during the latter decade. Impetuses for further establishment of local fan conventions include:

- The return of superhero characters and franchises during the Silver Age of Comic Books (1956-1970)
- science fiction adaptations for television serials (e.g., Star Trek) in the 1960s-1970s
- the growth of role-playing (in the 1970s and 1980s) as a genre of tabletop, live-action and eventually video/computer gaming, which not only inspired roleplay of favorite characters in full-body costumes but also inspired existing franchises to adapt their themes for said methods of gaming
- the growth in home taping (starting with VHS in the late 1970s) of television broadcasts, including popular serials.
- the growth of computerized communication, including the Internet and Internet-dependent applications in the 1980s and 1990s.

== 1930s ==
- Philcon (1936)
- Worldcon (1939)

== 1940s ==
- Boskone (1941)
- Eastercon (1948)
- Westercon (1948)

== 1950s ==
- Disclave (1950–1997)
- Midwestcon (1950)
- Lunacon (1957)

== 1960s ==
- MileHiCon (1960)
- Nihon SF Taikai (1962)
- DeepSouthCon (1963)
- First Long Beach Science Fantasy Convention (1963)
- Second Long Beach Science Fantasy Convention (1964)

=== 1965 ===
- Academy Con
- Detroit Triple Fan Fair
- Lucca Comics & Games — at that point known as "Salone Internazionale del Comics"

=== 1966 ===
- Balticon

=== 1967 ===
- Houstoncon

=== 1968 ===
- British Comic Art Convention
- Comic Art Convention
- Minicon

=== 1969 ===
- Aggiecon
- Bubonicon
- ConQuesT

== 1970s ==
- Multicon (1970–1982)
- Comic-Con — at that point called the "Golden State Comic-Con"

=== 1971 ===
- Arcana
- Creation Con
- Novacon
- VCON

=== 1972 ===
- Chicago Comic-Con — at that point called "Nostalgia '72"
- Eurocon
- Star Trek Lives, New York City
- Salón Internacional del Cómic del Principado de Asturias, Asturias, Spain (1972–2014)

=== 1973 ===
- Loscon
- Windycon

=== 1974 ===
- Angoulême International Comics Festival
- ConFusion
- LepreCon
- OrlandoCon
- TusCon

=== 1975 ===
- Atlanta Fantasy Fair (1975–1995)
- Comiket, Tokyo, Japan
- Icon (Iowa)
- NASFIC
- SwanCon
- Unicon (1975–1989)
- World Fantasy Convention

=== 1976 ===
- ConClave
- Chattacon
- Stellarcon

=== 1977 ===
- Archon
- CoastCon
- MidSouthCon
- Starfest
- Strip Turnhout Turnhout, Antwerp, Belgium — biennial show
- Wiscon
- OKON

=== 1978 ===
- MediaWest*Con
- Norwescon

=== 1979 ===
- ArmadilloCon
- FantaCon, Albany, New York (1979–1990; 2013)
- NatCon (New Zealand)
- OryCon
- Shore Leave Towson/Hunt Valley, MD (1979-2019; 2022-2023); COVID Virtual (2020-2021) Lancaster, PA (2024)

== 1980s ==
=== 1980 ===
- Ad Astra
- Mid-Ohio Con

=== 1981 ===
- Barcelona International Comics Convention
- Capricon
- InConJunction

=== 1982 ===
- BayCon
- Dallas Fantasy Fair (1982–1995)
- Heroes Convention
- I-CON (1982)
- Life, the Universe, & Everything
- Microcon

=== 1983 ===
- Comix Fair (1983–c. 1996) — Houston, TX
- SFeraKon
- SoonerCon

=== 1984 ===
- Con-Version
- Ohio Valley Filk Fest
- Polcon
- United Kingdom Comic Art Convention (UKCAC)
- Vulkon — at that point known as "Trekon"

=== 1986 ===
- Finncon
- Magnum Opus Con (1986–2001)
- Polaris

=== 1987 ===
- Confluence
- Dragon Con
- Readercon
- WonderCon

=== 1988 ===
- Starbase Indy
- Starfleet International Conference

=== 1989 ===
- Festival of Fantastic Films
- Motor City Comic Con

== 1990s ==
=== 1990 ===
- Octocon
- Arisia
- Gallifrey One
- DemiCon
- CONduit
- MarsCon (Virginia)
- Visions (1990–1998)
- A-Kon

=== 1991 ===
- Escapade Con
- DucKon
- SiliCon

=== 1992 ===
- CAN-CON
- CAPTION
- Convencion de Juegos de Mesa y Comics
- FedCon
- Diversicon
- Dimension Jump
- Stripdagen Haarlem
- World Horror Convention

=== 1993 ===
- FACTS
- MegaCon
- ConDor

=== 1994 ===
- Alternative Press Expo
- BotCon
- G-Fest
- Memorabilia
- Pittsburgh Comicon
- Small Press Expo (SPX)

=== 1995 ===
- Armageddon
- Fan Expo Canada — then known as the "Canadian National Comic Book Expo"
- Electronic Entertainment Expo (E3)

=== 1996 ===
- Albacon
- Big Apple Convention — then known as "Halleluja Con"
- Festival fantazie
- Jornadas de Cómic (Aviles, Spain)

=== 1997 ===
- Conestoga
- ShadowCon
- Wizard World Chicago — takes over Chicago Comicon

=== 1998 ===
- ICon festival (Israel)
- MOBICON
- Swecon

=== 1999 ===
- Comic Festival — at that point known as "Comic 99"
- CONvergence
- EerieCon
- Festival Internacional de Quadrinhos (FIQ)
- Générations Star Wars et Science Fiction
- MarsCon (Minnesota)
- Star Wars Celebration
- WillyCon
- Pyrkon

== 2000s ==
=== 2000 ===
- Baltimore Comic-Con
- DeepCon
- Gatecon
- New York International Sci-Fi and Fantasy Creators Convention (2000–2002)
- Small Press and Alternative Comics Expo (SPACE)
- Trinoc*coN (2000–2008)
- UnCommonCon (2000–2001)

=== 2001 ===
- Capclave
- Coco Bulles (2001–2009)
- ConGlomeration
- Vericon

=== 2002 ===
- Adventure Con
- ConCarolinas
- ConDFW
- Dallas Comic Con
- East Coast Black Age of Comics Convention (ECBACC)
- MAGFest
- MoCCA Festival
- Phoenix Comicon
- Supanova Pop Culture Expo, Australia

=== 2003 ===
- Anime Boston
- Anime Friends
- Emerald City ComiCon
- Granite State Comicon (Granitecon)
- TCAF
- Toronto Comic Con
- Monster-Mania Con
- ConBust Smith College Science Fiction/Fantasy Society Convention

=== 2004 ===
- ApolloCon
- Comic Expo (Bristol International Comic & Small Press Expo)
- Comics Salon (2004–2007) — Slovakia
- FenCon
- Itzacon
- Linucon (2004–2005)
- London Film and Comic Con
- Stumptown Comics Fest
- UK PonyCon

=== 2005 ===
- Hypericon
- Komikazen
- MomoCon
- STAPLE!
- TimeGate

=== 2006 ===
- BabelCon
- Central Canada Comic Con — at this point known as the "Manitoba Comic Con"
- Lille Comics Festival
- Montreal Comic-con
- New York Comic Con
- RavenCon

=== 2007 ===
- Lazy Dragon Con
- Geek.Kon
- Åcon

=== 2008 ===
- Comicpalooza
- Comics Fest India
- Hi-Ex
- SpoCon
- Gamescom (formerly Games Convention)

=== 2009 ===
- Brasil Game Show (BGS, formerly Rio Game Show (RGS))

== 2010s ==
=== 2010 ===
- Chicago Comic & Entertainment Expo (C2E2)
- Massachusetts Independent Comics Expo (MICE)
- Pensacola Comic Convention
- SFContario

=== 2011 ===
- BronyCon
- Comikaze Expo
- Treklanta (formerly TrekTrax Atlanta)

=== 2012 ===
- Chicago Alternative Comics Expo (CAKE)
- Denver Comic Con (DCC)
- East Coast Comicon — then known as the "Asbury Park Comicon"
- Everfree Northwest
- GalaCon
- London Super Comic Convention
- Rhode Island Comic Con
- TrotCon
- Wildcat Comic Con

=== 2013 ===
- BronyCAN
- Ponyville Ciderfest
- Salt Lake Comic Con

=== 2014 ===
- BABSCon
- Czequestria
- DashCon
- Comic Con Experience (CCXP)
- Kreepy Geek Con
- RuffleCon
- CONjuration

=== 2015 ===
- Asia Pop Comic Convention
- Cartoon Crossroads Columbus
- Gamercom
- For the Love of Sci-Fi
- Rupaul's Drag Con

=== 2016 ===
- Silicon Valley Comic Con

=== 2017 ===
- Warsaw Comic Con

=== 2018 ===
- Comic Con Africa
- Comic Con Liverpool
- Comic Con Scotland
- Empire City Con: A Steven Universe Fan Convention
- For the Love of Horror

=== 2019 ===
- Vanhoover Pony Expo
