= ConDFW =

Dallas area sci-fi convention

- Status: Active
- Genre: Science Fiction/Fantasy
- Venue: Hilton Dallas Lincoln Centre (since 2015)
- Locations: Dallas, Texas
- Country: United States
- Inaugurated: 2002
- Most recent: Annually
- Attendance: 550+
- Organizer: Texas Speculative Fiction Association
- Filing status: 501(c)(3)
- Website: http://www.condfw.org/

ConDFW was a literary science fiction and fantasy convention held annually in the Dallas, Texas, area from 2002-2019. Attendees mingled with author and artist guests, attended panel discussions and readings led by guests, got books signed, looked at and bought sci-fi and fantasy art from artists around the country, shopped in a dealer's room with books, art, games, clothing, weapons, and other items, donated used books to charity (and got some others in return), played games (both tabletop and live-action), or just hung out and talked to guests and attendees in the consuite or the hotel bar. ConDFW is a production of the Texas Speculative Fiction Association.

== Location ==
From its founding in 2002 through 2008, ConDFW convention was held at the Radisson Hotel Dallas North - Richardson in the heart of the Telecom Corridor at the intersection of Campbell Road and U.S. 75 in the Dallas suburb of Richardson, Texas. (32.974558°N 96.718290°W) For the 2009 through 2012 conventions, ConDFW relocated to the Crowne Plaza Suites at the intersection of I-635 and Coit Road in Dallas. In 2013 and 2014, ConDFW was held at the Crowne Plaza North Dallas on Midway Road between Spring Valley Road and Belt Line Road in the north Dallas suburb of Addison, Texas. Beginning in 2015, the convention was held at Hilton Dallas Lincoln Centre in Dallas. Beginning in 2017, the convention moved to the Radisson Hotel Fossil Creek in Fort Worth, Texas.

== Conventions ==
=== Past ===
ConDFW I was held February 23-24, 2002. The Guest of Honor was John Steakley. Other featured guests included David A. Cherry, Aaron Allston, Lillian Stewart Carl, Bill Crider, P.N. Elrod, Thomas W. Knowles, Julia Blackshear Kosatka, Lee Martindale, Teresa Patterson, Brad Sinor, Bruce Sterling, and Martha Wells.

ConDFW II was held February 21-23, 2003. The Guest of Honor was David Drake. The Artist Guests of Honor were David A. Cherry and Brad W. Foster. Other featured guests included Aaron Allston, Lillian Stewart Carl, Jayme Lynn Blaschke, P.N. Elrod, Lee Martindale, and Martha Wells.

ConDFW III was held February 20-22, 2004. The Guest of Honor was Lois McMaster Bujold. The Artist Guest of Honor was Alan Gutierrez. The Gaming Guest of Honor was Steve Jackson. Other special guests included Barry N. Malzberg, Robert Sheckley, Robert Asprin, and John Steakley.

ConDFW IV was held February 25-27, 2005. The guests of honor were Steven K. Z. Brust, Patrick Nielsen Hayden, and Teresa Nielsen Hayden. The Artist Guest of Honor was David A. Cherry. Other featured guests included Robert Asprin, Bill Fawcett, Jody Lynn Nye, and John Steakley.

ConDFW V was held February 24-26, 2006. The guests of honor were Don Maitz, F. Paul Wilson, and Janny Wurts. Featured guests included the Bedlam Bards.

ConDFW VI was held February 23-25, 2007. The guests of honor were Emma Bull, Will Shetterly, and Harry Turtledove. The Artist Guest of Honor was Bob Eggleton. Other featured guests included Robert Asprin, Steven K.Z. Brust, David A. Cherry, and John Steakley.

ConDFW VII was held February 22-24, 2008. The Guest of Honor was author Peter S. Beagle. The Artist Guest of Honor was Donato Giancola. The Special Guest was Tom Monteleone. Other featured guests included Aaron Allston, Rachel Caine, Brad Foster, David Cherry, Carole Nelson Douglas, Katharine Eliska Kimbriel, Lillian Stewart Carl, Martha Wells, Teddy Harvia, and Selina Rosen.

ConDFW VIII was held February 20-22, 2009. The guests of honor included authors Jim Butcher and David Weber plus animation studio Janimation, Inc. Other featured guests included Brad W. Foster, Carole Nelson Douglas, John Steakley, Lou Antonelli, Martha Wells, P. N. Elrod, Paul Black, Rachel Caine, Selina Rosen, Shanna Swendson, Steven Brust, and Teddy Harvia.

ConDFW IX was held February 12-14, 2010. The Guest of Honor was scheduled to be Nebula Award-winning author Jack McDevitt but a record-setting snowstorm in North Texas prevented him from flying in for the convention. Fortunately, Guest of Honor Elizabeth Moon was traveling by train and was able to attend.

ConDFW X was held February 18-20, 2011. The guests of honor included Nebula Award-winning author Jack McDevitt, author Tim Powers, New York Times best-selling author Brandon Sanderson, and Hugo Award-winning artist Brad W. Foster.

ConDFW XI was held February 17-19, 2012. The guests of honor were author Cherie Priest and artist William Stout.

ConDFW XII was held February 15-17, 2013, at the Crowne Plaza North Dallas. (This new location is the same hotel used by FenCon, All-Con, and Furry Fiesta.) The guests of honor included author Jo Walton and artist Brian Stelfreeze.

ConDFW XIII was held February 21-23, 2014, at the Crowne Plaza North Dallas. The guests of honor included author Kevin J. Anderson and artist Alain Viesca.

ConDFW XIV was held February 13–15, 2015, at the Hilton Dallas Lincoln Centre. The guests of honor included authors Sherwood Smith and Rachel Manija Brown, and artist Galen Dara.

ConDFW XV was held February 12–14, 2016, at the Hilton Dallas Lincoln Centre. The guests of honor included authors John Scalzi and Seanan McGuire.

ConDFW XVI was held February 10–12, 2017, at the Radisson Hotel Fossil Creek, Fort Worth, Texas. The guests of honor included author Rachel Caine and artist R. Cat Conrad.

ConDFW XVII was held February 16-18, 2018, at the Radisson Hotel Fossil Creek, Fort Worth, Texas. The scheduled guests of honor were author Charlaine Harris and artist John Picacio. Charlaine Harris was unable to attend because of a medical procedure.

ConDFW XVIII was held February 15-17, 2019, at the Radisson Hotel Fossil Creek, Fort Worth, Texas. The scheduled guests of honor were author Charlaine Harris and author Yoon Ha Lee.

=== Upcoming ===
The organizers announced that ConDFW XVIII was the final conDFW.
