= Meredith Dillman =

American artist

- Born: Minnesota
- Education: Minnesota State University Moorhead (BFA, 2002)
- Notable work: Watercolor Made Easy: Fairies & Fantasy
- Website: meredithdillman.com

Meredith Dillman is a fantasy artist and illustrator from Minnesota who specializes in fairies and fairy tale paintings. She has published multiple art books and illustrated the covers and interiors of art books and novels.

== Biography ==
=== Training and influences ===
Dillman graduated from the Minnesota State University Moorhead with a Bachelor of Fine Arts in illustration in 2002, and part of her time studying was spent in Japan. Her works have been partially inspired by manga. She has stated her influences include Art Nouveau, manga and other Asian influences, and the Pre-Raphaelite movement, as well as fantasy and fairy tales she enjoyed as a child.

=== Personal life ===
Dillman was born and raised in Minnesota. She now lives in Wisconsin, along with two cats and her husband.

== Works ==
Dillman has illustrated the covers and interiors of a number of different novels, role-playing games, and art instruction works. While most of her works are created in watercolor, she also uses acrylics and pen-and-ink.

Prints and originals of her works regularly appear in science fiction and fantasy convention art shows. In 2005, some of her works were available at the chain store Hot Topic.

=== Art and reference books ===
- Watercolor Made Easy: Fairies & Fantasy (2009, Walter Foster Publishing, ISBN 978-1-60058-141-0)
- Fantasy Fashion Art Studio (2013, Impact, ISBN 978-1-4403-2831-2)
- Trace & Color in Any Medium: Fairies (2015, Walter Foster Publishing, ISBN 978-1-60058-483-1)
- Foxes & Fairies (2017, self published, ISBN 978-0-692-86816-4)
- Fanciful Fairy Fashion (2018, self published, ISBN 978-1-71751-777-7)

=== Cover illustrations ===
- The Dragon Prince by Terri Pray (2005, Final Sword, ISBN 0-9723587-5-7)
- FaeBorn by Terri Pray (2005, Final Sword, ISBN 1-934153-53-2)
- Mercury Brightman: The First Sign by Mary E. Gober (2007, Lulu, ISBN 978-1-4303-1464-6)

=== Interior illustrations ===
- ArtWanted.com Creative Minds (2004, Art Slam Press, ISBN 0-9763304-1-5)
- Watercolor Fairies by David Riche and Anna Franklin (2004, Watson-Guptill, ISBN 0-8230-5640-6)
- 500 Fairy Motifs by Myrea Pettit (2005, Collins & Brown, ISBN 1-84340-302-1)
- How to Draw and Paint Fairies by Linda Ravenscroft (2005, Watson-Guptill, ISBN 0-8230-2383-4)
- Mermaid of Thera, edited by Ellen Million (2005, Ellen Million Graphics, ISBN 1-933603-00-3)
- How to Draw and Paint Fairyland: A Step-by-Step Guide to Creating the World of Fairies by Linda Ravenscroft (2008, Barron's Educational Series, ISBN 978-0-7641-3953-6)
- Vampire Art Now by Jasmine Becket-Griffith and Matthew David Becket (2011, Harper Design, ISBN 978-0-06-202571-5)
- Watercolor Fairy Art: How to Bring Your Fairy Realm Art to Life by Sara Burrier (2014, Barron's Educational Series, ISBN 978-1-4380-0436-5)
- Pentacle, various illustrations

=== Game illustrations ===
- Book of the Fantastical by Steven C. Brown, part of The Everlasting role-playing game (2003, Visionary Entertainment Studio, ISBN 188735803X)
- The Magician's Companion by Steven C. Brown, part of The Everlasting role-playing game (2004, Visionary Entertainment Studio, ISBN 1887358056)
- Final Twilight CCG

== Recognition and reception ==
During college, Dillman won several awards from the Minnesota Newspaper Association for her illustrations and comic strips in the university's student paper. She will be the artist guest of honor at MarsCon 2019.

Her works have been accepted at and displayed in a number of galleries, including The Galallery in San Francisco and the Eight and Sand Gallery in Seattle in 2016, the Minneapolis Institute of Art in 2010, and multiple shows at the Eye of Horus Gallery from 2006 to 2008.
