= The Summer King =

The Summer King or Summer King may refer to:

- The Summer King (novel), 1999 novel by O. R. Melling
- The Summer King (opera), a 2017 opera by Daniel Sonenberg, based on the story of baseball player Josh Gibson
- Summer King, a variant of the Red Astrachan apple cultivar
- The Summer King, a 2009 poetry collection by Joanna Preston, winner of the 2010 Mary Gilmore Prize

== See also ==
- Winter King
