= Vulkon Entertainment =

American entertainment company

- Genre: Science Fiction and Fantasy
- Fate: On hiatus
- Headquarters: Pembroke Pines, Florida, United States
- Products: Conventions across the United States
- Website: none

Vulkon Entertainment was an entertainment company which specialized in science fiction-related fan conventions. Founded by Joe Motes and Ruthanne Devlin in 1986, Vulkon produced its first convention in 1987 (making Vulkon and its predecessor Trekon one of the oldest and longest-running conventions in the state of Florida). Vulkon Entertainment organized five to ten conventions each year in many cities across America, as well as science fiction-themed cruises. The conventions were often Star Trek-centric, but usually included actors from other science fiction television series.

== Overview ==
Vulkon conventions programming included cosplay, dances, panels, workshops, game shows, banquets, karaoke, video games, artist alley, a dealers room, and once (the Halloween 2008 show) even hosted an actual wedding done in traditional Klingon fashion.

Vulkon historically attracted 1,000-3,000 visitors from all over the United States. However, in the face of the American economic recession of 2008 and 2009 the number of visitors started to dwindle, and the choice was made to cancel the first two shows of 2009, which had been scheduled for March of that year. The Vulkon franchise was officially put on hiatus shortly thereafter.

== History ==
Co-founder Joe Motes had produced prior conventions under different names as far back as October 31, 1976, at the Howard Johnson's, in Golden Glades, Florida, featuring a costume party/contest, bloopers, dealers, etc. In June 1984. Joe Motes organized "Trekon".

In 1986, Motes teamed up with Ruthanne Devlin in Miami to form Vulkon Entertainment. The first official Vulkon was held in Orlando in October 1987.

Between 1987 and 2007, Vulkon produced 12 Star Trek / Buffy the Vampire Slayer cruises, sailing with 8-15 stars on each cruise under the names "Trekruise", "Seatrek" and "Slayercruise".

From 1996 to 2000, Vulkon Entertainment teamed up with actor William Campbell to promote five "Fantasticons". raising over $400,000 for the Motion Picture & Television Country House and Hospital. Each of these conventions drew hundreds of stars and thousands of fans.

In 1999, Devlin sold her half of the company to Motes and retired to Seattle, Washington. In 1999, Fernando Martinez became partners with Motes until 2005. Ruthanne Devlin died on February 10, 2015.

In 2007, the Vulkon company and name were sold to Gary and Terri Tripp of Weston, Florida. When Joe Motes retired, he was the second longest-running promoter in America next to Creation Entertainment promoters Gary Berman and Adam Malin.

== Event history ==
Dates	Location	Approx. Atten.	Guests
June 1984 Trekon	Holiday Inn Biscayne; Miami, Florida	600	George Takei, Robin Curtis
August 1985 Trekon	Holiday Inn Biscayne; Miami, Florida	650	Walter Koenig
May 1986 Trekon	Holiday Inn Miami Calder; Miami, Florida	700	James Doohan
August 1986 Trekon	Holiday Inn Tampa Airport; Tampa, Florida	700	Robin Curtis
January 1987 Trekon	Holiday Inn Miami Calder; Miami, Florida	700	Nichelle Nichols, George Takei
October 1987 Vulkon	Sheraton Maitland; Orlando, Florida	300	Walter Koenig, Richard Arnold
October 1987	Sheraton Design Center; Fort Lauderdale, Florida	300	Robin Curtis, Grace Lee Whitney
January 16, 1988	Holiday Inn Downtown Tampa; Tampa, Florida	600	DeForest Kelley, Andrew Probert
January 17, 1988	Marriott Cypress Creek; Fort Lauderdale, Florida	700	DeForest Kelley, Andrew Probert
April 1988	Holiday Inn Ashley Plaza; Tampa, Florida	800	Jonathan Frakes
July 1988	Altamonte Springs Hilton; Orlando, Florida	1,000	Marina Sirtis, Mark Lenard
October 1988	Miami Airport Hilton & Marina; Miami, Florida	700	Majel Barrett, William Campbell
January 1989	Sheraton at St. Johns Place; Jacksonville, Florida	600	John de Lancie
March 1989	Holiday Inn Ashley Plaza; Tampa, Florida	700	Walter Koenig, Jeanne Kalogridis
November 1989	Altamonte Springs Hilton; Orlando, Florida	2,000	Patrick Stewart, Jeanne Kalogridis
January 1990	Sheraton at St. Johns Place; Jacksonville, Florida	600	George Takei
April 1990	Altamonte Springs Hilton; Orlando, Florida	1,200	Gates McFadden, Ann C. Crispin, Richard Arnold
June 1990	Fort Lauderdale Airport Hilton; Fort Lauderdale, Florida	800	Denise Crosby, Michael Okuda
October 1990	Holiday Inn Independence, Ohio; Cleveland, Ohio	2,400	Patrick Stewart, Carmen Carter
November 1990	Saint Petersburg Hilton and Towers; Saint Petersburg, Florida	1,500	Michael Dorn, Marina Sirtis, Jeanne Kalogridis
January 1991	Hyatt Regency Oak Brooks; Chicago, Illinois	900	Gates McFadden, Jeanne Kalogridis
March 1991	Altamonte Springs Hilton; Orlando, Florida	1,200	Marina Sirtis, Wil Wheaton, Laura Banks
June 1991 Fantasy Fair	Altamonte Springs Hilton; Orlando, Florida	800	Mark Goddard, Dick Durock, Tommy Kirk, Eric Menyuk
August 1991	Royce Hotel; West Palm Beach, Florida	700	John de Lancie, Ron Darian, Ken Olandt, Larry B. Scott
August 1991	Saint Petersburg Hilton and Towers; Saint Petersburg, Florida	1,600	DeForest Kelley, Jeanne Kalogridis, Michael Okuda, Richard Arnold
August 1991	Altamonte Springs Hilton; Orlando, Florida	1,200	Nichelle Nichols, George Takei, James Doohan
September 1991	Fort Lauderdale Airport Hilton; Fort Lauderdale, Florida	1,000	DeForest Kelley
February 1992	Castlegate & Conference Center; Atlanta, Georgia	3,900	Patrick Stewart, Jeanne Kalogridis, Michael Okuda, Richard Arnold, Laura Banks
April 1992	Altamonte Springs Hilton; Orlando, Florida	1,500	Brent Spiner, Peter David, Arne Starr, Ron Darian
June 1992 Genesis Khan	Radisson Hotel Birmingham; Birmingham, Alabama	400	James Doohan
August 1992 Genesis Khan	Radisson Hotel Richmond; Richmond, Virginia	400	Walter Koenig
September 1992	Hyatt Atlanta Airport; Atlanta, Georgia	1,400	Leonard Nimoy
November 1992	Saint Petersburg Hilton and Towers; Saint Petersburg, Florida	1,600	Leonard Nimoy, Ann C. Crispin
November 1992 Genesis Khan	Airport Marriott; Kansas City, Missouri	400	Mark Lenard, William Campbell, Arne Starr
January 1993	Holiday Inn DFW Airport; Dallas, Texas	600	John de Lancie, William Campbell
January 1993	Saint Petersburg Hilton and Towers; Saint Petersburg, Florida	1,300	John de Lancie, William Campbell, George Takei
February 1993	Hyatt Atlanta Airport; Atlanta, Georgia	1,600	DeForest Kelley, Majel Barrett
March 1993	Marriott's Hunt Valley Inn; Hunt Valley, Maryland	1,200	Leonard Nimoy, Daniel Davis, Arne Starr, Howard Weinstein, Bob Greenberger, Dave McDonnell, Carmen Carter, Melissa Crandall, Dennis Bailey
March 1993	Clarion Plaza Hotel; Orlando, Florida	600	Terry Farrell, Michael O'Hare
May 1993 Genesis Khan	Airport Marriott; Kansas City, Missouri	400	Daniel Davis
June 1993	Orlando Hilton South; Orlando, Florida	1,200	Nana Visitor, Daniel Davis, Michael Okuda
October 1993	Castlegate & Conference Center; Atlanta, Georgia	1,000	Gates McFadden, Daniel Davis
October 1993	Saint Petersburg Hilton and Towers; Saint Petersburg, Florida	1,300	Alexander Siddig, Robert O'Reilly, George Takei
January 1994	Saint Petersburg Hilton and Towers; Saint Petersburg, Florida	1,100	René Auberjonois
February 1994	Holiday Inn DFW Airport; Dallas, Texas	400	Nana Visitor, Arne Starr
March 1994	Sheraton Baltimore North; Towson, Maryland	800	Alexander Siddig, Michael O'Hare, Arne Starr
March 1994	Castlegate & Conference Center; Atlanta, Georgia	600	Armin Shimerman, Ann C. Crispin
March 1994	Orlando Hilton South; Orlando, Florida	1,100	Walter Koenig, Marc Alaimo
June 1994	Orlando Hilton South; Orlando, Florida	2,100	Leonard Nimoy, Arne Starr
August 1994	Fort Lauderdale Marriott North; Fort Lauderdale, Florida	900	Armin Shimerman
September 1994	Castlegate & Conference Center; Atlanta, Georgia	600	René Auberjonois
November 1994	Bayfront Hilton and Towers; Saint Petersburg, Florida	1,200	Marina Sirtis, Max Grodénchik, Yvonne Fern Solow
January 1995	Deerfield Beach Boca Raton Hilton; Boca Raton, Florida	400	Walter Koenig, Lolita Fatjo
February 1995	Saint Petersburg Hilton; Saint Petersburg, Florida	900	Terry Farrell, Arne Starr
February 11, 1995	Georgia World Congress Center; Atlanta, Georgia	1100	Leonard Nimoy
February 12, 1995	Civic Auditorium; Jacksonville, Florida	900	Leonard Nimoy
February 1995	Holiday Inn DFW Airport; Irving, Texas	600	René Auberjonois, David McDonnell
March 1995	Holiday Inn Independence; Cleveland, Ohio	800	Armin Shimerman, Mira Furlan, John Colicos, Arne Starr
March 1995	Sheraton Baltimore; Towson, Maryland	800	Armin Shimerman, Mira Furlan, John Colicos
March 1995	Orlando North Hilton; Altamonte Springs, Florida	1200	Bruce Boxleitner, Robert O'Reilly
April 29, 1995	Radisson Hotel; Birmingham, Alabama	300	Robert Picardo
April 30, 1995	Chattanooga-Hamilton County Convention Center; Chattanooga, Tennessee	300	Robert Picardo
July 1995	Orlando Hilton North; Altamonte Springs, Florida	900	Roxann Biggs-Dawson
July 22, 1995	War Memorial Auditorium; Fort Lauderdale, Florida	600	Tim Russ
July 23, 1995	Palm Beach Gardens Marriott; Palm Beach Gardens, Florida	500	Tim Russ
September 1995	Fort Lauderdale Marriott North; Fort Lauderdale, Florida	900	Robert Beltran, Penny Juday
November 1995	Saint Petersburg Hilton; Saint Petersburg, Florida	600	Ethan Phillips, Robert Duncan McNeill, Arne Starr
December 1995	Georgia World Congress Center; Atlanta, Georgia	900	Ethan Phillips, Robert Duncan McNeill, Penny Juday
March 1996	Sheraton Baltimore; Towson, Maryland	800	Roxann Biggs-Dawson, Jerry Doyle, Arne Starr
March 1996	Renaissance Cleveland Hotel; Cleveland, Ohio	700	Robert Beltran, David McDonnell, Lolita Fatjo
March 1996	Sheraton World Resort; Orlando, Florida	1300	William Shatner, John Eaves
April 1996	Saint Petersburg Hilton; Saint Petersburg, Florida	1000	Jennifer Lien, Garrett Wang, Arne Starr
May 18, 1996	Palmetto Expo Center; Greenville, South Carolina	600	Roxann Biggs-Dawson, David McDonnell
May 19, 1996	Atlanta Marriott North; Atlanta, Georgia	700	Roxanne Biggs-Dawson, David McDonnell
May/June 1996	Westin Hotel Cypress Creek; Fort Lauderdale, Florida	900	George Takei, John Eaves
June 1996	Altamonte Springs Hilton; Orlando, Florida	1200	Kate Mulgrew, David McDonnell
July 1996 Autograph Show	Holiday Inn International Drive Resort; Orlando, Florida	400	Kenneth Tobey, Robert Colbert, Warren Stevens, Mark Goddard, Luke Halpin, Kenny Miller, Arne Starr
September 1996	Saint Petersburg Bayfront Hilton; Saint Petersburg, Florida	900	Denise Crosby, Jerry Doyle, Arne Starr
Nov 30, 1996	Palm Beach Gardens Resort; West Palm Beach, Florida	400	Robert O'Reilly, Chase Masterson, Peter Mayhew, Jeremy Bulloch, Arne Starr
Dec 01, 1996	Park Plaza Hotel; Hialeah, Florida	400	Robert O'Reilly, Chase Masterson, Peter Mayhew, Jeremy Bulloch, Arne Starr
March 1997	Sheraton Cleveland City Center; Towntown Cleveland, Ohio	1000	Jennifer Lien, Patricia Tallman, Jeremy Bulloch, Peter Mayhew, David McDonnell
March 1997	Sheraton Baltimore North; Towson, Maryland	700	Robert Beltran, Patricia Tallman, David Prowse
March 1997	Saint Petersburg Bayfront Hilton; Saint Petersburg, Florida	1000	Robert Picardo, Patricia Tallman, Kenny Baker, Arne Starr
April 1997	Howard Johnson Castlegate; Atlanta, Georgia	800	Patricia Tallman, Mike Carter, Arne Starr, John Eaves
July 1997	Orlando Hilton North; Altamonte Springs, Florida	900	Armin Shimerman, Chase Masterson, Jonathan Del Arco, Arne Starr
July 13, 1997 - Atlanta Autograph & paper Collectible Show	Howard Johnson Midtown; Atlanta, Georgia	200	Kenneth Tobey, Warren Stevens
September 28, 1997 - Orlando Autograph & paper Collectible Show	Holiday Inn International Drive; Orlando, Georgia	300	Kenneth Tobey, Warren Stevens
September 1997	Howard Johnson Castlegate; Atlanta, Georgia	800	Robert Beltran, Richard Biggs
November 1997	Saint Petersburg Bayfront Hilton; Saint Petersburg, Florida	1200	Jeri Ryan, Chase Masterson, Richard Chaves, James Hong, Arne Starr
March 1998	Sheraton Baltimore North; Towson, Maryland	800	Robert Beltran, Jennifer Hetrick
March 1998	Orlando Hilton South; Orlando, Florida	1,000	Tim Russ, Joshua Cox, Lolita Fatjo, Arne Starr
May 1998	Bayfront Hilton and Towers; Saint Petersburg, Florida	900	Andrew Robinson, Aron Eisenberg, Mark Allen Shepherd, Arne Starr, David McDonnell
May 1998	Holiday Inn Marietta; Marietta, Georgia	500	Ethan Phillips, Robin Atkin Downes, Penny Juday
June 1998	Holiday Inn Independence; Cleveland, Ohio	700	Robert Duncan McNeill, Anne Lockhart
October 1998	Bayfront Hilton and Towers; Saint Petersburg, Florida	1,300	Marina Sirtis, Dirk Benedict, Herb Jefferson Jr., Anne Lockhart, Arne Starr
November 1998	Orlando Hilton South; Orlando, Florida	600	Robert Beltran, Henry Darrow, Arne Starr
November 1998	Holiday Inn Independence; Cleveland, Ohio	1,000	Tim Russ, Joshua Cox, Josh Clark
November 8, 1998 - Orlando Autograph & paper Collectible Show	Holiday Inn International Drive; Orlando, Florida	300	Anne Francis, Warren Stevens, James Drury, James Best, Luke Halpin
January 1999	North Raleigh Hilton; Raleigh, North Carolina	1,100	Garrett Wang, Jeff Conaway, Dirk Benedict, Mary Kay Adams
March 1999	Sheraton Baltimore North; Baltimore, Maryland	1,400	Marina Sirtis, Dirk Benedict, Joshua Cox
March 1999	Holiday Inn Marietta; Atlanta, Georgia	1,000	Tim Russ, Max Grodénchik, Joshua Cox
April 1999	Orlando Hilton South; Orlando, Florida	1,500	Nicole de Boer, Jeff Conaway, Arne Starr
July 1999	Bayfront Hilton and Towers; Saint Petersburg, Florida	2,000	James Darren, Peter Jurasik, Robert Colbert, Arne Starr, Astronaut Alan Bean
October 1999	Cleveland Holiday Inn Strongsville; Cleveland, Ohio	1,300	James Darren, Jeff Conaway, Alexandra Tydings, Robert Colbert, Wortham Krimmer, Mark Allen Shepherd, Astronaut Edgar Mitchell
October 3, 1999 - Orlando Autograph & paper Collectible Show	Holiday Inn International Drive; Orlando, Florida	300	Erin Gray, Robin Curtis, Bobby Clark, Doreen Tracy, Lonnie Barr, Roberta Shore
November 1999	Orlando Hilton South; Orlando, Florida	2,100	James Marsters, Andreas Katsulas, Peter Woodward, Wortham Krimmer, Carrie Dobro, David Allen Brooks, Alice Krige, Arne Starr
March 2000	Orlando Hilton South; Orlando, Florida	1,500	Claudia Christian, Max Grodénchik, Aron Eisenberg, Chase Masterson, Cecily Adams, Astronaut Edgar Mitchell, Tucker Smallwood, Astronaut Richard A. Searfoss, Tucker Smallwood, Lolita Fatjo, Arne Starr
May 2000	Doubletree Hotel Airport; Tampa, Florida	1,500	George Takei, Alice Krige, Salome Jens, Jeffrey Willerth, Chris Owens, Arne Starr
August 12, 2000 - (Trek Happening)	Broward Community College; Pembroke Pines, Florida	200	Astronaut Richard A. Searfoss, Jonathan Del Arco
September 2000	Sheraton Buckhead Hotel; Atlanta, Georgia	600	Bruce Campbell, Garrett Wang, James Marsters, Dirk Benedict, Laurette Spang, Chase Masterson, Aron Eisenberg, Anne Lockhart, Brian Thompson
September 2000	Sheraton Fort Lauderdale; Fort Lauderdale, Florida	800	Bruce Campbell, Chase Masterson, William Sadler, Dirk Benedict, Brian Thompson, Tim Colceri
October 2000	Holiday Inn Strongsville; Cleveland, Ohio	900	Andreas Katsulas, Chase Masterson, Max Grodénchik, Aron Eisenberg, Cecily Adams, Peter Woodward, Julie Caitlin Brown, Arne Starr
November 2000	Orlando Hilton South; Orlando, Florida	1,200	Bruce Campbell, Ted Raimi, Tracy Scoggins, Jeffrey Combs, Marjorie Monaghan, Kurt Wetherill, Cody Wetherill, Dirk Benedict, Laurette Spang, Richard Hatch, Jerome Blake, Arne Starr
April 2001	Orlando Hilton South; Orlando, Florida	1,500	Nichelle Nichols, Robert Duncan McNeill, William Sadler, Richard Herd, Arne Starr
May 2001	Atlanta Marriott Century Center; Atlanta, Georgia	800	George Takei, Bruce Campbell, Alice Krige, Judson Scott
July 2001	Tampa Airport Hilton; Tampa, Florida	1,000	Walter Koenig, Gates McFadden, Denise Crosby, Paul L. Smith, Jerome Blake, James Horan, Arne Starr
September 2001 (9/11 weekend)	Sheraton Fort Lauderdale Airport Hotel; Fort Lauderdale, Florida	100	Bruce Campbell, Arne Starr
October 2001	Holiday Inn Strongsville; Cleveland, Ohio	1,000	Walter Koenig, Alice Krige, Denise Crosby, Bruce Campbell, Dirk Benedict, Herb Jefferson Jr.
November 2001	Orlando Hilton South; Orlando, Florida	2,500	Kate Mulgrew, James Doohan, Virginia Hey, David Carradine, Linda Harrison, William Jordan (actor), Bill Blair, Marjorie Monaghan, Julia Nickson, Arne Starr
January 2002	Sheraton Fort Lauderdale Airport; Fort Lauderdale, Florida	800	Nana Visitor, Casey Biggs, Virginia Hey, David Carradine, Tim Choate, Julie Caitlin Brown, Arne Starr
March 2002	Orlando Hilton South; Orlando, Florida	800	René Auberjonois, Armin Shimerman, Barry Morse, Kent McCord, Peter Williams, Herb Jefferson Jr., Arne Starr
April 2002	Holiday Inn Southpark Center; Cleveland, Ohio	900	Robert Picardo, John Billingsley, Barry Morse, Jeffrey Combs, James Doohan, Alice Krige, David Carradine
May 2002	Atlanta Marriott Century Center; Atlanta, Georgia	800	John Billingsley, J. G. Hertzler, Barry Morse, James Doohan, Bruce Boxleitner
July 2002	Tampa Airport Hilton Westshore; Tampa, Florida	1,200	Jonathan Frakes, Dominic Keating, Tony Amendola, Richard Herd, Julie Caitlin Brown, Arne Starr
November 2002	Orlando Hilton South; Orlando, Florida	2,500	Avery Brooks, Bruce Boxleitner, Jerry Doyle, Manu Intiraymi, Alan Ruck, Glenn Shadix, Jack Stauffer, Astronaut Edward Gibson, Douglas Arthurs, Arne Starr
May 2003 Sci-Fi / SlayerCon	Tampa Airport Hilton Westshore; Tampa, Florida	1,000	Michael Dorn, Alexander Siddig, Mira Furlan, Corin Nemec, Teryl Rothery, Astronaut Richard F. Gordon Jr., James Marsters, Andy Hallett, James Leary, Robin Atkin Downes, Arne Starr, Judson Scott
September 2003	Holiday Inn Independence; Cleveland, Ohio	1,000	Michael Dorn, Dominic Keating, James Doohan, Richard Herd, Bobby Clark, Mira Furlan, Astronaut Walt Cunningham, Douglas Arthurs, Glenn Shadix, Julie Caitlin Brown
October 2003 SlayerCon	Sheraton Nashville Downtown; Nashville, Tennessee	1,000	Nicholas Brendon, Juliet Landau, Julie Benz, Robin Atkin Downes, Danny Strong, Adam Busch, George Hertzberg, James Leary, John Kassir, Robia LaMorte
November 2003	Orlando Hilton South; Orlando, Florida	1,600	William Shatner, John Billingsley, Jeffrey Combs, Julie Caitlin Brown, Chase Masterson, Astronaut Walt Cunningham, Max Grodénchik, Arne Starr
June 2004 SlayerCon	Doubletree Hotel Tampa Airport; Tampa, Florida	1,000	Christian Kane, James Leary, George Hertzberg, Mark Lutz, Emma Caulfield, J. August Richards, Camden Toy, Morena Baccarin
July 2004	Doubletree Hotel Tampa Airport; Tampa, Florida	1,000	Christopher Judge, Alexis Cruz, Connor Trinneer, Patricia Tallman, Jeffrey Willerth, Dean Haglund, Michael Forest
August 2004	Holiday Inn Independence; Cleveland, Ohio	1,000	William Shatner, Tracy Scoggins, Alexis Cruz, Andrea Thompson, Chase Masterson, Max Grodénchik, Malachi Throne, Dean Haglund, Manu Intiraymi, Marley S. McClean, Kurt Wetherill, Cody Wetherill, Keir Dullea, Gary Lockwood, BarBara Luna
August 2004 SlayerCon	Oakland Marriott City Center; Oakland, California	1,200	James Marsters, Andy Hallett, George Hertzberg, Iyari Limon, Mercedes McNab, Anthony Head, Juliet Landau, Robia LaMorte, Julie Benz, Alexis Denisof, Tom Lenk, Danny Strong, Adam Busch, James Leary, Christian Kane, Mark Lutz, Emma Caulfield, J. August Richards
October 2004	Sheraton Nashville Downtown; Nashville, Tennessee	1,000	Kate Mulgrew, George Takei, Malachi Throne, Vaughn Armstrong, Chase Masterson, Garrett Wang
November 2004	Orlando Hilton South; Orlando, Florida	2,400	Leonard Nimoy, Don S. Davis, Malachi Throne, Peter Jurasik, Keir Dullea, Gary Lockwood, Richard Hatch
March 2005	Orlando Hilton South; Orlando, Florida	2,000	Brent Spiner, Michael Shanks, Gary Jones, Dean Haglund, Tom Braidwood, Carmen Argenziano
April 2005 SlayerCon	Sheraton North Houston; Houston, Texas	900	James Marsters, Amber Benson, Andy Hallett, Kelly Donovan, Jonathan Woodward, Jennifer Mollen
April 2005	Holiday Inn Independence; Cleveland, Ohio	800	Jonathan Frakes, George Takei, Mary Oyaya, Greg Evigan, Richard Hatch, Carmen Argenziano, Gary Jones
November 2005	Orlando Hilton South; Orlando, Florida	1,200	Jolene Blalock, Linda Park, Anthony Montgomery, Ethan Phillips, Robert Beltran, Robert Picardo
April 2006	Holiday Inn Independence; Cleveland, Ohio	1,000	Connor Trinneer, Linda Park, Anthony Montgomery, LeVar Burton, Robert Picardo, Ethan Phillips, Robert Duncan McNeill, Gil Gerard, Erin Gray, Alexis Cruz, Tony Amendola, Tim O'Connor (actor)
July 2006 SlayerCon	Double Tree Hotel Westshore Airport; Tampa, Florida	1,000	Amy Acker, Vincent Kartheiser, Jonathan Woodward, Bianca Lawson, Mark Metcalf, Sarah Thompson, Brian Thompson
October 2006	Orlando Hilton South; Orlando, Florida	1,000	Avery Brooks, Gates McFadden, Armin Shimerman, Suzie Plakson, Denise Crosby, Tim Russ, Walter Koenig
May 17–19, 2007	Orlando Hilton South; Orlando, Florida	1,000	Nicole de Boer, Katee Sackhoff, Marina Sirtis, Suzie Plakson, John Schneider
October 27–29, 2007	Orlando Hilton South; Orlando, Florida	1,000	Connor Trinneer, George Takei, Nichelle Nichols, Jeffrey Combs, Marc Alaimo, Louise Fletcher
July 18–20, 2008	Orlando Hilton North; Orlando, Florida	1,000	Jonathan Frakes, Nana Visitor, Barbara March, Gwynyth Walsh, Cirroc Lofton
October 30-November 1, 2008	Orlando Hilton North; Orlando, Florida	800	Terry Farrell, Dwight Schultz, Bill Mumy, Nicki Clyne, Reuben Langdon

=== Cruises ===
Dates	Event/Location	Approx. Atten.	Guests
May 15–18, 1987	Trekruise87 East; S.S. Emerald Seas; Miami to Nassau and Little Stirrup Cay	950	DeForest Kelley, James Doohan, George Takei, Nichelle Nichols, Walter Koenig, Majel Barrett, Mark Lenard, Grace Lee Whitney, Robin Curtis, Richard Arnold
Sept 11-14, 1987	Trekruise87 West; S.S. Azure Seas; Los Angeles to Ensenada	950	James Doohan, George Takei, Walter Koenig, Majel Barrett, Mark Lenard, Grace Lee Whitney, Robin Curtis, Richard Arnold, Andrew Probert
May 12–15, 1989	SciFiCruise89; S.S. Emerald Seas; Miami to Nassau	950	Gene Roddenberry, James Doohan, George Takei, Walter Koenig, Majel Barrett, Mark Lenard, Grace Lee Whitney, Robin Curtis, Richard Arnold, Denise Crosby, Marina Sirtis, Wil Wheaton, William Campbell, John de Lancie
May 26–31, 1991	SciFiCruise91; S.S. Britanis; Miami to Key West & Mexico	950	Gene Roddenberry, James Doohan, George Takei, Walter Koenig, Majel Barrett, Mark Lenard, Grace Lee Whitney, Robin Curtis, Denise Crosby, Carel Struycken, Wil Wheaton, William Campbell, John de Lancie, Eric Menyuk, Robert Justman, Arne Starr
May 16–21, 1993	SciFiCruise93; S.S. Britanis; Miami to Jamaica & Grand Cayman	950	John de Lancie, James Doohan, George Takei, Majel Barrett, Mark Lenard, Robin Curtis, Diana Muldaur, Jerry Hardin, Daniel Davis, William Campbell, John de Lancie, Eric Menyuk, Arne Starr
June 10–17, 1995	SciFiCruise95; Carnival Celebration; Miami to Eastern Caribbean	900	Majel Barrett, Lolita Fatjo, René Auberjonois, Michael Ansara, Robin Curtis, Armin Shimerman, Robert Picardo, John Colicos, William Campbell, Tim Russ, Eric Menyuk, Arne Starr
June 15–22, 1997	SciFiCruise97; Carnival Jubilee; Los Angeles to Mexico	800	Robert O'Reilly, Chase Masterson, George Takei, Cirroc Lofton, Richard Biggs, Jerry Doyle, Robin Curtis, William Campbell, Karen Westerfield, Arne Starr
June 16–23, 1999	SciFiCruise99; Carnival Destiny; Miami to Mexico & Jamaica	800	Ron Moore, William Campbell, Tim Russ, Lolita Fatjo, Max Grodénchik, Jerry Doyle, Penny Juday, Aron Eisenberg, Chase Masterson, Jeff Conaway, Robin Curtis
June 13–20, 2001	SciFiCruise2001; Carnival Spirit; Seaward, Alaska to Vancouver	600	Kurt Wetherill, Cody Wetherill, Tim Russ, Manu Intiraymi, Garrett Wang, Jerry Doyle, Marley S. McClean, Chase Masterson, Lolita Fatjo, Richard Arnold
December 7–14, 2003	SciFiCruise2003; Royal Caribbean Adventure of the Seas; San Juan to Aruba, St. Thomas	400	Rod Roddenberry, Garrett Wang, Tim Russ, George Takei, Casey Biggs, Richard Arnold
June 11–18, 2005	Slayercruise2005; Holland America The Zuiderdam; Ft. Lauderdale to St. Thomas, Tortola	350	Andy Hallett, Clare Kramer, James Leary, Jonathan Woodward, Amber Benson, Camden Toy, Robia LaMorte, Iyari Limon
June 22–29, 2007	Slayer/SciFiCruise2007; Royal Caribbean Vision of the Seas; Seattle to Alaska & Inside Passage	250	Connor Trinneer, Clare Kramer, Jonathan Woodward, Robert Picardo, George Hertzberg, Ethan Phillips, Denise Crosby, Claudia Christian, Elisabeth Röhm, Richard Arnold
