= Christopher Collins =

American actor and comedian

- Collins in Road House, 1989
- Born: Christopher Lawrence Latta; August 30, 1949; Orange, New Jersey, U.S.
- Died: June 12, 1994 (aged 44); Ventura, California, U.S.
- Other names: Chris Latta; Chris Collins
- Occupations: Actor; comedian
- Years active: 1975–1994
- Spouse: Judith Ryan
- Children: 3

Christopher Charles Collins (born Christopher Lawrence Latta; August 30, 1949 – June 12, 1994) was an American actor and stand-up comedian. He is best known as the voice of Cobra Commander in the G.I. Joe animated series and Starscream in the first Transformers animated series. He had a few guest roles in the Star Trek series The Next Generation and Deep Space Nine, he voice acted Moe Szyslak and Mr. Burns in the first season of The Simpsons (1989–1990), and he had many other roles in television series and films. He also had a successful stand-up comedy career.

== Early life ==
Christopher Lawrence Latta was born in Orange, New Jersey to Robert Latta (1920–1966), a New York stage actor, and Jane Morin (1925–2001), an advertising executive. He grew up in the Morningside Heights (sometimes called "West Harlem") section of Manhattan, New York City. His legal name became Christopher Charles Collins when his stepfather adopted him.

After a year at New York University, he studied acting, dance, voice, and mime in Paris.

== Career ==
=== Radio work and stand-up comedy ===
In the mid-1970s, he acted on the New York and Boston stage and did voice-over work for Boston radio station WBCN.

Collins's stand-up career peaked in the late 1980s and early 1990s, when he performed in most of the major comedy venues in the United States and Canada. In 1990, he won the San Francisco International Stand-Up Comedy Competition.

=== Voice acting ===
Collins made his animation voice acting debut as one of the English dubbers of the 1979 anime series Space Battleship Yamato (also called Star Blazers). He was most recognizable in that series as the voice of space marine Sgt. Knox during the Comet Empire installment.

When he began regular voice work, he adopted his birth name as his stage name, as another Screen Actors Guild actor was performing as Chris Collins.

In 1983, Collins began voicing Cobra Commander for a five-part G.I. Joe animated mini-series. He continued voicing the role in a second five-part animated mini-series in 1984, a regular animated series beginning in 1985, a 1987 direct-to-video animated movie and a 1989 animated series. Co-star Neil Ross, who voiced Shipwreck, Buzzer, and Dusty in the show, praised Collins' performance for his ability to "howl and scream" for hours without losing his voice, claiming he had "barbed wire" for vocal cords.

Starting in 1984, Collins voiced the Decepticon Starscream for the Transformers animated series. He voiced other G.I. Joe and Transformers characters in these series as well as in toy commercials. These included the Autobot scientist Wheeljack, the Autobots' human friend Sparkplug Witwicky, the G.I. Joe Marine Gung-Ho and the Dreadnok Ripper. In Inhumanoids, he voiced D'Compose and Tendril. In Visionaries: Knights of the Magical Light, he voiced Darkstorm and Cravex. He provided voices in The Real Ghostbusters, credited as Chris Collins.

In The Simpsons, Collins originated the voice of Mr. Burns in the first-season episodes "Simpsons Roasting on an Open Fire", "The Telltale Head", and "Homer's Odyssey", and recorded lines as Moe Szyslak for "The Telltale Head" and "Some Enchanted Evening" (but was dubbed over in the latter). Along with several other early Simpsons voice actors, he left during the first season. Hank Azaria took over the voice of Moe, while Harry Shearer assumed the role of Mr. Burns. In a 2018 interview with GQ, Azaria commented on replacing Collins as Moe, saying that he did not find out until years later that he had replaced another actor. Azaria said that when he asked why he had replaced Collins, he was told by Matt Groening, "He (Collins) was great... He was just a dick. His voice was great, he was just kind of jerky to everyone." Azaria continued, "Think about how awful—that guy could have been on The Simpsons his whole life. Lesson to you kids: Always be nice!"

=== Live action ===
Later in the 1980s, he adopted the stage name of Christopher Collins and acted in many live-action television series and motion pictures. In Star Trek: The Next Generation, he played Klingon Captain Kargan in the episode "A Matter of Honor" and Pakled Captain Grebnedlog in the episode "Samaritan Snare". In Star Trek: Deep Space Nine, he portrayed two different Markalians: Durg in "The Passenger", and an unnamed assistant to The Albino in "Blood Oath". In Married... with Children, he played Roger, one of Al Bundy's bowling buddies and a member of NO MA'AM (National Organization of Men Against Amazonian Masterhood). He portrayed a mugger on an episode of Seinfeld titled "The Subway". He appears as Mr. Forbes in a first-season episode of NYPD Blue titled "Abandando Abandoned". In 1989, he hosted King Koopa's Kool Kartoons, but was later fired from the show and replaced with Patrick Pinney allegedly due to inappropriate behavior toward crew and audience members.

His first live-action feature film appearance is a bit part as the sharing husband in the film Road House. He appeared in True Identity, Stop! Or My Mom Will Shoot, Blue Desert, and A Stranger Among Us.

On April 28, 2012, Collins was posthumously inducted into the Transformers Hall of Fame. His daughter Abigail accepted on his behalf.

== Personal life ==
Collins married twice and had three children. Early in his career, he divided his time between New York, Boston, and Los Angeles before settling in L.A. in 1983. In 1991, he moved to Ventura, California.

In an interview, Flint Dille, a writer for several animated series Latta performed in, recalled:

There was one summer when I had to bail Chris Latta out of the Hollywood jail in order to get him to the recording on time. Never figured out what he was in for, but he said it was jaywalking. Chris was a wild, interesting guy. I liked him and was very sorry to hear that he died.

== Death ==
Collins died on June 12, 1994, at the age of 44, due to complications of encephalitis.

== Filmography ==
- Star Blazers (1979, TV Series) – Comet Empire General Dire / Sergeant Knox
- G.I. Joe: A Real American Hero (1983, TV Mini-Series) – Cobra Commander / Gung-Ho / Breaker / Steeler (voice)
- Pac-Man (1983, TV Series) – (voice)
- Spider-Man and His Amazing Friends (1983, TV Series) – Beetle / Sandman (voice)
- The Transformers (1984–1987, TV Series) – Starscream / Wheeljack / Sparkplug Witwicky / Laserbeak / Buzzsaw / Reflector / Defensor / Furg / Krunk (voice)
- G.I. Joe: The Revenge of Cobra (1984, TV Mini-Series) – Cobra Commander / Gung-Ho / Ripper (voice)
- Bigfoot and the Muscle Machines (1985) – Adrian Ravenscrodr / Ernie Slye (voice)
- The Transformers: The Movie (1986, TV Series) – Starscream / Laserbeak (voice, uncredited)
- G.I. Joe: A Real American Hero (1985, TV Series) – Cobra Commander / Gung-Ho / Breaker / Steeler / Ripper / Horrorshow / Frostbite (voice)
- Inhumanoids (1986, TV Series) – D'Compose / Tendril / Statesman Granahue (voice)
- The Blinkins: The Bear and the Blizzard (1986, TV Movie) – Slime (voice)
- Inhumanoids: The Movie (1986) – D'Compose / Granahue / Tendril (voice)
- G.I. Joe: The Movie (1987) – Cobra Commander / Gung-Ho / Ripper (voice)
- Visionaries: Knights of the Magical Light (1987, TV Series) – Darkstorm / Cravex / Falkama (voice)
- The Real Ghostbusters (1987–1990, TV Series) – Sammy K. Ferret (voice)
- This Is America, Charlie Brown (1988, TV Mini-Series) – Sailor/Samoset (voice)
- Superman (1988, TV Series) – (voice)
- Mr. Belvedere (1988, TV Series) – Tom
- Mama's Family (1989, TV Series) – Larry McCary
- Star Trek: The Next Generation (1989, TV Series) – Captain Grebnedlog and Captain Kargan
- Road House (1989) – Sharing Husband
- Anything But Love (1989, TV Series) – Charles
- King Koopa's Kool Kartoons (1989, TV Series) – King Koopa
- G.I. Joe: Operation Dragonfire (1989, TV Mini-Series) – Cobra Commander (voice, uncredited)
- The Butter Battle Book (1989, TV Special) - The Chief Yookaroo
- The Simpsons (1989–1990, TV Series) – Mr. Burns (voice) / Moe Szyslak (voice)
- G.I. Joe: A Real American Hero (1990–1992, TV Series) – Cobra Commander (voice)
- Blue Desert (1991) – Phone Man
- Doogie Howser, M.D. (1991, TV Series) – Mr. Stapleton
- Rover Dangerfield (1991) – Big Boss / Coyote / Sparky / Wolf / Horse (voice)
- True Identity (1991) – Frank LaMotta
- Danger Team (1991, TV Movie) – Truk (voice)
- Seinfeld (1992, TV Series) – Thug
- Stop! Or My Mom Will Shoot (1992) – Gang Member
- A Stranger Among Us (1992) – Chris Baldessari
- The Golden Palace (1992, TV Series) – Angel
- Civil Wars (1992, TV Series) – P.J. Stone
- Star Trek: Deep Space Nine (1993–1994, TV Series) – Guard and Durg
- Married... with Children (1993–1994, TV Series) – Roger
- NYPD Blue (1994, TV Series) – Paul Forbes

Preceded by none	Voice of Starscream; 1984–1986	Succeeded by Doug Parker
Preceded by none	Voice of and portrayed Sparkplug Witwicky; 1984–1985	Succeeded by Kevin Dunn
Preceded by none	Voice of Cobra Commander; 1985–1990	Succeeded by Scott McNeil
