= Memorabilia (event) =

Fan convention in the UK

Memorabilia was a fan convention event held in the United Kingdom since 1994, aimed at fans and collectors of film, television and sporting memorabilia. The event, now a sister event to the MCM London Comic Con, described itself as "Europe's largest collectors fair for sci-fi, pop, cult tv, comics & film memorabilia." Memorabilia featured exhibit spaces that held screenings, costumed performers greeting fans, celebrity signings, replicas of movie props and sets, and booths for dealers to sell merchandise.

== History ==
The Memorabilia convention took place several times a year. Spring shows generally were held at the NEC Birmingham, and winter shows at the ExCeL Centre in London Docklands.

The convention attracts over 30,000 visitors and about 250 traders. It has in previous years been held three times a year, and with additional events in other locations (notably London, Manchester, and Glasgow).

Memorabilia was purchased by events company MCM Expo Group in 2008 and underwent significant change from a trade-focused event in order to attract a wider public audience. Q&A sessions, screening areas and gaming tournaments were added. Several years later, Memorabilia was folded into MCM's London Comic Con.

Celebrity guests were originally found dotted around the hall but in recent shows have been placed together in a special guest area.

== Guest appearances ==
In addition to the trading and marketing aspects of Memorabilia, there are also guest appearances from television and film actors and sporting celebrities. Many sign autographs and pose for photographs. Personalities who have appeared at Memorabilia include:

=== Film and television ===
- The cast of 'Allo 'Allo!
- Andrew Secombe, Watto in the Star Wars prequels
- Annette Badland, who has appeared in the films Little Voice and Charlie and the Chocolate Factory, and television's Coronation Street
- Colin Baker, a former Doctor Who
- Tom Baker, a former Doctor Who
- David Carradine, Bill in the Kill Bill films
- George Lazenby, a former James Bond
- George A. Romero, horror film director
- Leslie Phillips, veteran actor recently seen in Venus
- Michael Madsen, star of Reservoir Dogs, the Kill Bill films and Sin City
- Don Calfa, star of The Return of the Living Dead and Chopper Chicks in Zombietown
- Craig Charles, most famous for his role as Lister in Red Dwarf and presenter of Robot Wars
- Kenny Baker, R2-D2 from Star Wars
- Jack Coleman, star of Heroes
- Linda Blair, best known as Regan in horror film The Exorcist
- Robert Llewellyn, best known for his role as Kryten from Red Dwarf and presenter of Scrapheap Challenge

=== Sport ===
- Ian Wright, record-breaking Arsenal striker
- Jake LaMotta, champion boxer and subject of the film Raging Bull
- Smokin' Joe Frazier, former World Heavyweight Champion boxer
- Peter Shilton, former England goalkeeper
- Trevor Francis, the first million-pound English player
- Torrie Wilson, WWE wrestler
