= Sabazel =

- Author: Lillian Stewart Carl
- Language: English
- Publication date: 1985

Sabazel is a 1985 novel written by Lillian Stewart Carl.

== Plot summary ==
Sabazel is a novel in which the daughter of a queen forges an alliance with a rebellion-beset young king, despite tensions between their cultures. Worship of the goddess had been suppressed, but the king gradually learns religious tolerance. Their union occurs during a ritual, leading to the conception of a son, whose acceptance as heir becomes a major conflict. Sabazel's amazon society, which allows men only during quarterly rites, clashes with the male-dominated kingdoms, adding political and religious intrigue.

== Reception ==
John T. Sapienza, Jr. reviewed Sabazel and The Winter King for Different Worlds magazine and stated that "As a literary question, what interested me the most was how the author handles the battle of the sexes. Each of these novels is the story of young people learning their early lessons about the other sex, in the course of dealing with the chaos of war. What she has to say with well worth reading, and I'm looking forward to the next generation."

== Reviews ==
- Review by Ardath Mayhar (1984) in Science Fiction Review, Winter 1984
- Review by Thomas D. Clareson (1985) in Extrapolation, Fall 1985
- Review by Robert Coulson (1986) in Amazing Stories, January 1986
