= BabelCon =

- Status: Ended
- Genre: Science fiction/Multi-genre
- Locations: Baton Rouge, Louisiana
- Country: United States
- Inaugurated: 2006
- Most recent: 2010
- Attendance: 160 (2010)
- Organizer: Babelcon LLC

BabelCon was a science fiction and multigenre convention, held in Baton Rouge, Louisiana. Established in 2006, the convention took place at the Cook Hotel and Lod & Carole Cook Alumni Center on the campus of Louisiana State University. Formerly a project of the non-profit Science & Engineering Education Foundation (SEEF), it was last managed by Babelcon LLC. After a split between the organizers in late 2010, the upcoming convention was postponed then ultimately cancelled.

This convention was typically a three-day event comprising panels, seminars, demonstrations, and workshops. Guests sometimes include science fiction and fantasy authors, artists, and celebrities from genre television series and movies. BabelCon was named for the site of a diplomatic conference in the classic Star Trek episode "Journey to Babel".

== History ==
BabelCon was launched in 2006, as a project of a local science fiction and gaming group, Star One Delta (SOD). The organizers were inspired to create BabelCon after Crescent City Con in New Orleans ended a 20-year run in 2005 and, in the wake of Hurricane Katrina, efforts to launch a new convention in New Orleans were stalled. In 2008, BabelCon was legally separated from Star One Delta, and a new non-profit organization, the Science & Engineering Education Foundation (SEEF), was created to run the convention.

== Conventions ==
=== Past events ===
BabelCon was held on Saturday, August 5, 2006, at the West Baton Rouge Conference Center in Port Allen, Louisiana. Notable guests at the one-day event included Lost In Space actor Bob May.

BabelCon 2 was held on Saturday, August 4, 2007 at the West Baton Rouge Conference Center in Port Allen, Louisiana. Activities included gaming, a fantasy art show, science panels, and celebrity guests. Notable guests at the one-day event included Star Trek actors Lee Meriwether and Robert O'Reilly as well as several local authors and fan groups.

BabelCon 3 was held on July 19–20, 2008, at the Holiday Inn Select in Baton Rouge, Louisiana. The two-day event featured guest stars Richard Hatch, Suzie Plakson, J. G. Hertzler, and Bob May, paranormal investigators Kalila Katherina Smith and Brad Duplechein, plus several local authors and educators. Attendance was estimated to be about 1000 fans.

BabelCon 4 was held on July 17–19, 2009, at the Cook Hotel in Baton Rouge, Louisiana. Guest stars at the three-day event included Rekha Sharma, Tiffany Grant, Patrick Burns, as well as several local authors and educators. Convention staff said attendance was "down slightly from past years".

BabelCon 4.5 was held on March 19–21, 2010, at the Cook Hotel in Baton Rouge, Louisiana. Originally listed as "BabelCon 2010 - the Year We Make Contact" it was changed to a "mini-con" and given the designation of "4.5". The convention aimed at "a cozy con atmosphere" relying on panels rather than celebrity guests for entertainment. Scaled back due to economic pressures from the late-2000s recession, the event featured Sal Lizard, the president of Starfleet International, as its headline guest. As in previous conventions local authors also gave talks and spoke with guests.

=== Cancelled events ===
The next BabelCon event was originally scheduled to be held March 25–27, 2011, but was postponed. After a split in convention management in late 2010, many of the original BabelCon staff and organizers planned their own event after the BabelCon name was registered with the Louisiana Secretary of State by another individual. This event, the Louisiana Science Fiction and Costuming Festival, was first held March 25–27, 2011.

In April 2012, new management acquired the assets of Babelcon LLC to settle existing debts and allow the event to move forward. Due to funding issues and another change in management, Babelcon was tentatively rescheduled for mid-October 2012. The convention was eventually cancelled and the organization dispersed.
