= Move Along Home =

- Star Trek: Deep Space Nine episode
- Episode no.: Season 1 Episode 10
- Directed by: David Carson
- Story by: Michael Piller
- Teleplay by: Frederick Rappaport; Lisa Rich; Jeanne Carrigan-Fauci
- Cinematography by: Marvin Rush
- Production code: 410
- Original air date: March 14, 1993

Guest appearances
- Joel Brooks as Falow; James Lashly as Lt. George Primmin; Clara Bryant as Chandra

Episode chronology
← Previous "The Passenger"	Next → "The Nagus"
- Star Trek: Deep Space Nine season 1

"Move Along Home" is the tenth episode of the first season of the American syndicated science fiction television series Star Trek: Deep Space Nine. It was originally aired on American television in syndication on March 14, 1993.

Set in the 24th century, the series follows the adventures on Deep Space Nine, a space station located near a stable wormhole between the Alpha and Gamma quadrants of the galaxy. In this episode, the Wadi, a group of aliens from the Gamma Quadrant, pay a visit to Deep Space Nine; they challenge the bartender Quark to play a board game in which the lives of the station's crew appear to be at stake.

The episode has gained notoriety as one of the worst episodes of the series.

== Plot ==
Deep Space Nine makes first contact with a Gamma Quadrant species known as the Wadi. Upon arriving, the Wadi head straight to Quark's bar. When the Wadi leader, Falow, realizes Quark has rigged a gambling table against them, he persuades Quark to play "an honest game".

Meanwhile, the station's senior officers Commander Sisko, Dr. Bashir, Major Kira, and Lt. Dax find themselves in a bizarre labyrinth. Security chief Odo finds them missing from the station; he and Quark come to realize that the missing officers are part of the game Quark is playing.

In the game, the officers are faced with bizarre and deadly puzzles. On the second level they find a young girl singing a rhyme and playing a version of hopscotch; a force field prevents them from crossing the room, until Dax realizes that to get through the force field they must sing the rhyme and copy her hops and hand movements. On the third level they find themselves at a party in a room filling up with a deadly gas; only by drinking the partygoers' beverages can they survive. Later on the fourth level one piece is removed from the game, and Bashir disappears from the maze.

Quark is faced with a choice between a shorter, more difficult path or a longer, easier one for his remaining players. He chooses the shortcut, explaining that with risks to his players involved in every move, advancing them home as soon as possible is the wiser choice. However, the results of his next roll force him to sacrifice one of his players.

Quark begs Falow not to make him choose, so the game chooses at random. On the sixth and last level, Sisko, Kira, and Dax are faced with scaling a mountain during an earthquake, and Dax's leg becomes stuck between two rocks. Although she tells Sisko to leave her behind, he and Kira help her cross a ledge on the rock face. They slip, however, and all three fall into the abyss—only to re-materialize in Quark's, along with Bashir. Quark is relieved to see all four unharmed, but Falow points out that he has lost, and explains that none of them were ever in any danger.

As Sisko is about to angrily confront Falow over what they have experienced, Odo tells him that he would do better to talk with Quark about his attempt to cheat their guests. The Wadi quietly depart, but Quark hurries after them, sensing an opportunity to market their game.

== Production ==
This was the second episode of Deep Space Nine directed by David Carson. Carson found it extremely challenging, due to the cost and complexity of the episode, but showrunner Michael Piller wanted to do the episode. The story began as an idea from Piller, and was originally titled "Sore Losers".

== Reception ==
In 1993, "Move Along Home" was nominated for an Emmy Award for best hairstyling in a series.

The episode has developed a reputation among both fans and critics as one of the worst episodes of the series. For example, in 2019, ScreenRant ranked it among the ten worst episodes of Star Trek: Deep Space Nine, noting that at that time it had a rating of only 6 out of 10 based on user rankings on the site IMDb. Digital Fox ranked this episode as the second worst episode of all Star Trek series up to 2018. In 2018, CBR included this episode in a list of Star Trek episodes that are "so bad they must be seen"; similarly, in 2020, SyFy called this the "silliest" episode of the series, but actually encouraging watching it, commenting: "This thing is so weird, it can't not be celebrated." A 2015 binge-watching guide for Star Trek: Deep Space Nine by Wired recommended skipping this episode.

In 2016, fans at the 50th-anniversary Star Trek convention voted "Move Along Home" as the worst episode of the series, and the eighth-worst episode of the Star Trek franchise overall—the only episode of Deep Space Nine to end up in the bottom ten. Avery Brooks, who played Commander Sisko, reported during a panel discussion at DragonCon in 2013 that this was one of his two least favourite episodes.

One positive reaction the episode received was from Fatherly, which listed this episode a recommended watch for parents and children; they describe it as silly and bizarre, but entertaining.

== What We Left Behind ==
Film-quality scans of scenes from this episode were shown in theaters in May 2019 in the documentary film about the series called What We Left Behind. Its one-day one-showing release played at about 800 theaters and grossed over $380,000.

== Releases ==
On February 8, 1997, this episode was released on LaserDisc in Japan as part of the half-season box set 1st Season Vol. 1. This included episodes from "Emissary" to "Move Along Home" with both English and Japanese audio tracks.

It was released on DVD as part of the season one box set on June 3, 2003.

This episode was released again in 2017 on DVD with the Star Trek: Deep Space Nine: The Complete Series box set, which had 48 optical discs with the 176 episodes of the series and additional features.
