= WhoFest =

- WhoFest logo
- Status: Defunct
- Genre: Science fiction
- Venue: Westin Dallas/Fort Worth Airport Hotel
- Locations: Dallas, Texas
- Country: United States
- Inaugurated: 2013
- Attendance: 950+ (2015)
- Organizer: Dallas Future Society
- Filing status: 501(c)(3)
- Website: www.whofestdfw.org

WhoFest is a recurring Doctor Who-focused science fiction convention held in the Dallas, Texas, area. First held in the 1990s and again in November 2013 as a one-off celebration of the 50th anniversary of Doctor Who, WhoFest is now held annually each April.

WhoFest is a production of the Dallas Future Society, a non-profit 501(c)(3) corporation that seeks to promote the advancement of science, literature, and music for all mankind. This is the same organization that has run FenCon, a literary and music oriented general interest science fiction convention, since 2004.

== Programming ==
Notable features of WhoFest include how-to programming, panels, fan discussions, gaming, a diverse selection of guests, celebrity encounters, a charity auction, a dealers room, "WhoKids" children's programming, trivia contests, concerts, and a dance on Saturday night. Many attendees wear costumes as various Doctor Who characters and others.

== Critical reaction ==
In June 2013, the Fort Worth Star-Telegram named WhoFest as one of the "red-letter dates for geeks, fans, [and] collectors" as well as one of the signs that Dallas/Fort Worth has become "so geeky". In November 2013, the Dallas Observer called WhoFest "an enjoyable, eye-opening experience". In February 2015, the Fort Worth Star-Telegram declared WhoFest an event that "jumped out and made our nerd hearts go pitter-pat". In April 2015, The Dallas Morning News described WhoFest as a way to "get your geek on" and "a fun event for all Doctor Who fans".

== Past conventions ==
=== 2013 - WhoFest ===
WhoFest was held November 22–24, 2013, at the Crowne Plaza North Dallas in Addison, Texas. The convention was held on these dates to coincide with the 50th anniversary of the first Doctor Who broadcast in 1963. While the event featured panelists, experts, and fans, there were no celebrity guests from the television series at the convention. Activities included costume contests, discussion panels, videos, WhoKids children's programming, and participation in the live worldwide debut of The Day of the Doctor 50th anniversary special.

Activities in support of Carter BloodCare, that year's designated charity, included a live auction and a blood drive. The convention chair was James Mahaffey. The convention T-shirt was designed by Barry Whitewater and the "50 Years of Doctor Who" poster was created by Keri O'Brien. Forced to cap membership sales at 1,000 due to space limitations in the hotel, WhoFest sold out months in advance, prompting the convention to seek a new home for WhoFest 2.

=== 2015 - WhoFest 2 ===
WhoFest 2 and the Irving Invasion was held April 24–26, 2015, at the Westin Dallas/Fort Worth Airport in Irving, Texas. Key program participants included actors Colin Baker (who played the Sixth Doctor), Nicola Bryant (companion Peri Brown), Terry Molloy (Davros), and Nicholas Briggs (voice of Daleks, Cybermen, and other characters) plus producer Jason Haigh-Ellery of Big Finish Productions. The convention chain was James Mahaffey.

WhoFest held an auction and other fundraisers during the convention to raise $5,000 and hundreds of pounds of food donations for that year's designated charity, the North Texas Food Bank. Artist Keri O'Brien designed the convention's signature "TARDIS dressed as the Sixth Doctor" artwork which was used by Michael Braun to create unique art prints and the convention's official T-shirt.

=== 2016 - WhoFest 3 ===
WhoFest 3 and the Daleks of DFW was held April 22–24, 2016, at the Westin Dallas/Fort Worth Airport in Irving, Texas. Key program participants included actors Eve Myles, Frazer Hines, Wendy Padbury, Richard Franklin, Simon Fisher-Becker, Ian McNeice, and Colin Spaull plus writer Andrew Cartmel. The convention co-chairs were Tim Miller and Mike Erickson. WhoFest held a charity auction to benefit Habitat for Humanity of South Collin County. Artist Michael Braun designed the convention's signature "Dalek invasion via the Margaret Hunt Hill Bridge" artwork featured on promotional posters, merchandise, and the convention's official T-shirt.

=== 2017 - WhoFest 4 ===
WhoFest 4: The Power of Five was held May 5–7, 2017, at the Westin Dallas/Fort Worth Airport in Irving, Texas. Key program participants included actors Peter Davison (who played the Fifth Doctor), Dan Starkey, and Mark Strickson and toastmaster Devin Pike. WhoFest held a charity auction to benefit local PBS station KERA. The convention co-chairs were Robyn Winans and Mike Erickson.

== Upcoming conventions ==
On September 17, 2017, WhoFest announced on its Facebook page that the convention had begun an indefinite hiatus.
