= The Passenger (Star Trek: Deep Space Nine) =

- Star Trek: Deep Space Nine episode
- Episode no.: Season 1 Episode 9
- Directed by: Paul Lynch
- Story by: Morgan Gendel
- Teleplay by: Morgan Gendel; Robert Hewitt Wolfe; Michael Piller
- Production code: 409
- Original air date: February 22, 1993

Guest appearances
- Caitlin Brown as Ty Kajada; James Lashly as Lt. George Primmin; Christopher Collins as Durg; James Harper as Rao Vantika

Episode chronology
← Previous "Dax"	Next → "Move Along Home"
- Star Trek: Deep Space Nine season 1

"The Passenger" is the ninth episode of the American science fiction television series Star Trek: Deep Space Nine.

Set in the 24th century, the series follows the adventures on Deep Space Nine, a space station located adjacent to a stable wormhole between the Alpha and Gamma quadrants of the Milky Way Galaxy, near the planet Bajor. In this episode a sinister criminal hides in the mind of someone on Deep Space Nine.

The episode first aired in broadcast syndication on February 22, 1993.

== Plot ==
En route back to the station in a runabout, Major Kira and Dr. Bashir respond to a distress call from a Kobliad freighter and find Ty Kajada, a security guard, and her prisoner, Rao Vantika. Kajada tells them Vantika started a fire on the ship in an effort to escape. Vantika dies and Bashir and Kira take Kajada back to Deep Space Nine, where she becomes convinced that he is still alive. He has faked his death many times before and Kajada has spent most of her adult life tracking him.

Bashir and Lt. Dax come to believe that Vantika's consciousness might be hiding in Kajada's brain without her knowledge. Vantika has indeed taken on another body, and he contacts Quark, a bartender with criminal contacts, to hire mercenaries to hijack an upcoming shipment of deuridium — a compound Kobliads desperately need to survive. Later, when Quark meets with the mercenaries, they are interrupted as Kajada falls from the second floor of Quark's bar while eavesdropping on them.

In the infirmary, Kajada reveals that the real Vantika pushed her. Dax finds a device under the dead Vantika's fingernails that he used to transfer his consciousness to someone else and tests Kajada for signs of the device's usage. Meanwhile, Quark and the mercenaries meet with the real Vantika, in the body of Bashir.

One step ahead of the crew's investigation, Vantika and the mercenaries manage to gain control of the freighter carrying the deuridium. The station traps the freighter in a tractor beam but Vantika threatens to destroy the freighter, along with Bashir's body. One of the mercenaries objects to such a plan, prompting Vantika to shoot him. Dax is able to disrupt Vantika's control of Bashir's body long enough for a confused Bashir to lower the freighter's shields and allow himself to be transported to the Infirmary. Once Vantika's consciousness is removed from Bashir's brain, Kajada formally takes possession of Vantika's stored consciousness and destroys it and thus rids herself of him once and for all.

== Reception ==
In 2012, The A.V. Club categorized this episode as a "crime-horror", and were overall critical of the various plot lines and scenes.

In 2016, Atlantic Classic Comics ranked "The Passenger" last in a ranking of all 173 episodes of Star Trek: Deep Space Nine.

In 2019, ScreenRant ranked this episode one of the ten worst episodes of Star Trek: Deep Space Nine.

== Releases ==
On February 8, 1997 this episode was released on LaserDisc in Japan as part of the half-season box set 1st Season Vol. 1. This included episodes from "Emissary" to "Move Along Home" with both English and Japanese audio tracks.
