= Winter King =

Winter King may refer to:

- A derisive sobriquet applied to Frederick V of the Palatinate
- A sobriquet sometimes applied by historians to Henry VII of England
- The Winter King (character), a character in the TV series Adventure Time: Fionna and Cake
- "The Winter King" (episode), a 2023 episode of the TV series Adventure Time: Fionna and Cake
- The Winter King (Cornwell novel), novel of The Warlord Chronicles trilogy by Bernard Cornwell
- The Winter King (TV series), British Arthurian fiction television series, based on the Cornwell novels
- The Winter King (Carl novel), a 1986 novel by Lillian Stewart Carl
- 'Winter King', a cultivar of Crataegus viridis (green hawthorn)

== See also ==
- "Winter's King", a science fiction short story
- Holly King and Oak King with the Holly King also known as the Winter King.
