= Paul Black (author) =

American novelist

- Born: July 22, 1957 (age 69); Hinsdale, Illinois, U.S.
- Education: University of Oklahoma
- Writing career
- Period: 2003–present
- Genre: Science fiction
- Website: www.paulblackbooks.com

Paul Black (born July 22, 1957 in Hinsdale, Illinois) is an American graphic artist, designer and writer of general and science fiction. He is best known for his near-future science fiction trilogy, The Tels.

== Early life ==
Black grew up in the western suburbs of Chicago, Illinois. His passion for art and writing began early. By age twelve, he had advanced into adult level drawing classes. By high school, he had completed a book of poetry and his first novella. He attended the University of Oklahoma, where he earned a degree in graphic design and was a 2-time national champion gymnast.

== Career ==
His first book, The Tels, won Writers Digest's Book of the Year for Genre Fiction, along with the Independent Publishers Book Award for Science Fiction, as well as being a finalist in the Eric Hoffer Book Awards for Science Fiction and ForeWord Magazine's Book of the Year for Science Fiction. His second book, Soulware, was also a finalist for the Independent Publishers Book Award for Science Fiction and won second place in ForeWord Magazine's Book of the Year for Science Fiction. His third book, Nexus Point, is the Gold Medal winner for ForeWord Magazine's Book of the Year for Science Fiction. His fourth book, The Presence, won the 2011 Independent Publishers Book Award for Science Fiction. His fifth book, The Samsara Effect, won the 2013 Independent Publishers Book Award for General Fiction, along with the New York and London Book Festivals and Foreword Magazine's Book of the Year Award for Science Fiction. His sixth book, Cool Brain, won the 2016 International Book Award, along with the New York, San Francisco and London Book Festivals.

== Personal life ==
Paul Black lives in Santa Fe, New Mexico.

== Novels ==
- The Tels (2003) Novel Instincts (ISBN 0972600701)
- Soulware (2004) Novel Instincts (ISBN 0972600728)
- Nexus Point (2007) Novel Instincts (ISBN 0972600736)
- The Presence (2010) Novel Instincts (ISBN 978-0-9726007-4-3)
- The Samsara Effect (2012) Novel Instincts (ISBN 978-0-9726007-8-1)
- Cool Brain (2016) Novel Instincts (ISBN 978-0-578-17190-6)
- Dark Slide (2019) Novel Instincts (ISBN 978-1-7923-1395-0)
