= Lillian Stewart Carl =

American s.f., fantasy and mystery writer (born 1949)

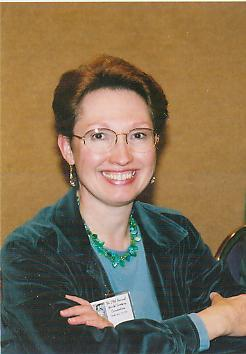
- Born: 1949 (age 75–76)

Lillian Stewart Carl (born 1949) is an American author of mystery, fantasy and science-fiction novels.

Carl resides in North Texas. She has been a friend of Lois McMaster Bujold since childhood; both authors credit Carl with getting Bujold started writing. This is described in the introduction to Bujold's collection Dreamweaver's Dilemma. Bujold's second novel, The Warrior's Apprentice, is dedicated to Carl. Both authors are friends with fantasy and sci-fi author Patricia Wrede. Lillian co-edited The Vorkosigan Companion, a retrospective on Lois McMaster Bujold's science fiction work, with John Helfers. It was published by Baen Books in December 2008 and nominated for a Hugo Award in the "Best Related" category at Anticipation, the 2009 Worldcon.

== Self description ==
In her biographical statement on her website and in her publicity materials, Carl says:

Lillian has lived for many years in North Texas, in a book-lined cloister cleverly disguised as a tract house. Therefore she's developed a passion for mountains and seacoasts, especially the ones in Scotland. Lillian is a member of The Author's Guild, Novelists Inc., Science Fiction Writers of America, and Sisters in Crime.

== Genre ==
Carl originally wrote science fiction and fantasy, then branched out later to romantic suspense and mystery. Many of her books also cross genres, containing touches of what she calls her own genre mix of all the above with touches of the paranormal.

Carl states that: "It was she [Bujold] who introduced me to science fiction and fantasy in general and Tolkien in particular." and "Recently I re-read my first published fantasy novels. I was appalled to discover I'd used several Tolkien-esque phrases — quite unconsciously, as so much of his prose is now lodged deep in my subconscious."

== Critical response ==
=== Lucifer's Crown ===
Jayme Lynn Blaschke writes:

Lucifer's Crown is not an easy book to describe or classify. It tries to be many things at once, but first and foremost, it's a novel of Biblical apocalypse. In a time where Christian fiction with an apocalyptic bent — led by the wildly popular Left Behind series — is a multi-million dollar industry, it was inevitable that more traditional fantasy writers would eventually turn their hand to these tropes and themes. Lillian Stewart Carl, in taking up this challenge, has responded with her most complex and ambitious novel to date. What's more important, it's also by far her best.

Planted firmly and unabashedly in the tradition of the Inklings, Lucifer's Crown evokes the theology-steeped works of C.S. Lewis and Charles Williams — a connection reinforced by repeated references and allusions to Tolkien.... Carl's book compares favorable to another classic work of Christian-themed fantasy, The Book of the Dun Cow by Walter Wangerin, Jr.... But pigeonholing Lucifer's Crown as apocalyptic Christian fiction does a grave disservice to the book and to readers. It's so much more than that. Carl has taken half a dozen or more traditions and genres, mixing them together to forge an alloyed novel of unexpected strength.

His praise is not unmixed, however—he complains that:

Two serious flaws work against the novel, however — flaws made all the worse by being easily correctable, to my mind. Carl opens the book by throwing almost the entire cast at the reader, making it hard to grasp and identify with any of them, much less the setting of contemporary Glastonbury. ... The other major problem I had with Lucifer's Crown is infuriating simply because it's so utterly unnecessary: The novel takes place in the final months of the year 2000. That's right, we're treated to yet another clichéd end-of-the-millennium apocalypse. Other than hopelessly dating a story that otherwise manages to be effectively timeless, the move is just downright dumb.

Library Journal wrote:

Blending historical mystery with a touch of the supernatural, the author creates an intriguing exploration of faith and redemption in a world that is at once both modern and timeless.

In Green Man Review Matthew Scott Winslow wrote:

Lillian Stewart Carl's latest fantasy novel, Lucifer's Crown, effectively combines Arthurian legend, Grail myth, and British folkways to create a powerful novel.

The highest praise I can give this novel is that it reminds me strongly of Charles Williams, but it succeeds where Williams always failed: it has believable characters. Not at first, however. It takes Ms. Carl about fifty to seventy-five pages to get into her stride with this story. Until then, the characters feel stiff and wooden and contrived.

Also much like Williams is the theological and philosophical subtext. Ms. Carl takes the ideas of good vs. evil quite seriously and probes deeply into the idea of redemption. She does not, however, take her themes lightly, instead giving them a vigorous shaking down before she's done, resulting in a gripping spiritual thriller. One could easily call this 'in the tradition of Charles Williams' — which it certainly is — but it more importantly moves beyond that master of the spiritual thriller.

=== Along the Rim of Time ===
Jayme Lynn Blaschke writes:

Like many genre authors, Carl perfected her craft at the short fiction level.... I was delighted to find Carl's most important stories collected here for the first time.... Of the 11 stories contained here, all have some sort of underlying mythic/historical theme, which is Carl's forté.... Perhaps the most ambitious story here is "From the Labyrinth of Night." A Martian exploration setup is developed nicely with rich allusions to the Minotaur legends of ancient Crete, culminating in the "sacrifice" demanded by the beast in the maze. The interpersonal relationships are the real driving force to the narrative, as by this point, the astronauts' explorations are mechanical efforts done out of habit more than enthusiasm.... "Upon this Shoal of Time" is another ambitious science fiction story cloaked in the trappings of mythology. This time, Carl takes the reader to a far-future archaeological dig, where real science is dependent upon the financial sponsorship of media conglomerates hopeful of unearthing exclusive rights to digs that capture the public fancy, King Tut-style. After unearthing an intact Pictish skull from a Scottish burial site in Cawdor, Dr. James Henderson subjects it to a series of elaborate processes, each one designed to unlock lost memories from the subject at the sub-atomic level. His experiment is far more successful than he'd ever dreamed. At turns disturbing and impressive, with MacBethian overtones, Carl crafts a moving tale around the strength and impact memories can have on a person. One of the strongest stories presented here — the fuzzy science of the premise is presented smoothly and logically, detracting nothing from the narrative.

=== Shadow Dancers ===
in Thrust Ardath Mayhar writes:

Anyone who believes that fantasy must contain magic and elves has never read the work of Mary Renault...in Lillian Carl we have found another who can offer her readers an alternate reality that will live inside the mind long after the book has been finished."

=== Wings of Power ===
in Thrust Ardath Mayhar writes

...resonances between adolescent lust and mature love, between interior and exterior beauty, and between faith and skepticism underlie the story with a steely webwork of reality...an elegant thread of eroticism woven with delicacy and with through the story...the prose is crafted with a jeweler's precision and the use of imagery is masterful. Carl may well be the finest stylist working in fantasy today.."

=== Ashes to Ashes ===
In the Ohioana Quarterly Barbara Leskey writes:

...characters come to life through Carl's ear for everyday dialogue...especially spell-binding is the realistic description of the ghostly presence that stalks the twisted corridors...the reader is drawn into the mystery as well as the love story that unfolds...a believable story laced with historical fact and delicious humor. I highly recommend it..."

=== Memory and Desire ===
In Murder Express Kay Martinez writes:

The setting is wonderful, Ms. Carl describes the village of Somerstowe and the English climate so well that this reader felt as if she were viewing a film. The characters, both major as well as minor, come to life clearly with all their traits, quirks, and foibles helping the reader understand some of their actions. The mystery kept me guessing until the last few chapters where I had an "AHA! moment" just as I suspect the author intended.

=== Shadows in Scarlet ===
Publishers Weekly's reviewer wrote:

Presenting a delicious mix of romance and supernatural suspense, Carl (Ashes to Ashes) delivers yet another immensely readable tale. She has created an engaging cast and a very entertaining plot, spicing the mix with some interesting twists on the ghostly romantic suspense novel.

in Romantic Times, Toby Bromberg writes:

Shadows in Scarlet successfully combines time-travel elements with classic romantic suspense. There is a little something for everyone here, making for a pleasing read.

=== The Secret Portrait ===
Library Journal writes:

In pursuit of information about Bonnie Prince Charlie's legendary lost gold, reporter Jean Fairbairn discovers a new corpse instead. Before all is said and done, she tangles with a nouveau-riche Stuart aficionado and Inspector Cameron. An entertaining blend of policing and sleuthing.

=== The Murder Hole ===
In Cozy Library "Diana" writes:

Billed as a blend of mystery, romance and the paranormal, The Murder Hole is a meaty book.... Not a frothy mystery to gulp down in one sitting, it’s a book to save for a lazy weekend or relaxing vacation when there’s time to savor the complexities of the story and take in the scent and sense of Scotland.

=== The Burning Glass ===
Publishers Weekly's reviewer wrote:

Authentic dialect...detailed descriptions of the castle and environs, and

vivid characters recreate an area rich in history and legend. The tightly woven plot is certain to delight history fans with its dramatic collision of

past and present.

Kirkus Reviews writes:

A little romance, a dash of mystery and a soupcon of history make a hearty...dish.

=== The Muse and Other Stories of History, Mystery and Myth ===
On Lesa's Book Critiques, Lesa Holstine writes:

The Muse and Other Stories of History, Mystery and Myth allows the author to explore a range of historical periods, and literary classics. Carl has intriguing plots in which she challenges the reader to look at culture with a different eye. Lillian Stewart Carl invites the interested reader into a collection of stories filled with the magic of the past.

=== Blackness Tower ===
On ParaNormal Romance Reviews, Clover Autrey writes:

Lillian Stewart Carl's writing is at once intelligent, captivating, and

romantic, caressed by light fingers of poetic description. In no way am I going to give anything away about the mystery itself except to say that I pride myself on usually being able to figure them out. This one kept me intrigued and guessing until the end. In fact, she had so many clues and details involving the present and not one, but two time lines from the past, I was a little worried that Carl wouldn't be able to pull off a satisfying ending. But I worried for nothing, because the ending blew me away.

Blackness Tower is definitely a keeper, a book meaty enough to inspire hours

and hours of discussion for the most tenacious book club.

== Bibliography ==
=== Books ===
- Sabazel series — Fantasy
  - Sabazel. Ace Books. 1985. ISBN 0-441-74522-9.
  - The Winter King. Ace Books. 1986. ISBN 0-441-89443-7.
  - Shadow Dancers. Ace Books. 1987. ISBN 0-441-75988-2.
  - Wings of Power. Ace Books. 1989. ISBN 0-441-85549-0.
- Reid/Campbell series — Romantic Suspense
  - Ashes to Ashes. Diamond Charter. 1990. ISBN 1-55773-421-6.
  - Dust to Dust. Diamond Charter. 1991. ISBN 1-55773-547-6.
  - Garden of Thorns. Diamond Charter. 1992. ISBN 978-1-55773-800-4. — spin-off from the Reid/Campbell series.
- Along the Rim of Time. Writers Club Press. 2000. ISBN 0-595-09333-7. (collection of short fiction including previously unpublished story, Wild Honey)
- Memory and Desire. Wildside. 2000. ISBN 1-58715-268-1.) . ISBN (Romantic Suspense)
- Shadows in Scarlet. Wildside Press. 2001. ISBN 1-58715-375-0. (Romantic Suspense)
- Time Enough to Die. Wildside Press. 2002. ISBN 1-58715-294-0. (Mystery)
- Lucifer's Crown. Five Star. 2003. ISBN 0-7862-5348-7. (Fantasy Thriller)
- Jean Fairbairn/Alasdair Cameron series — Mystery
  - The Secret Portrait. Five Star. 2005. ISBN 1-59414-307-2.
  - The Murder Hole. Five Star. 2006. ISBN 1-59414-480-X.
- The Burning Glass. Five Star. 2007. ISBN 978-1-59414-591-9.
  - The Charm Stone. Five Star. November 2009. ISBN 978-1-59414-770-8.
- The Muse and Other Stories of History, Mystery, and Myth. Delphi Books. 2007. ISBN 978-0-9765185-5-6. (Collection of short fiction)
- Blackness Tower. Juno Books. 2008. ISBN 978-0-8095-7202-1. (Romantic Fantasy) ParaNormal Romance Reviewer's Top Pick, July 2008
- The Vorkosigan Companion. Baen Books. 2008. ISBN 978-1-4165-5603-9. (Non fiction, co-edited with John Helfers)
- The Blue Hackle (November 2010) Five Star Publishing

=== Short fiction ===
- "The Borders of Sabazel" in Amazons II (1982), DAW Books, ISBN 0-87997-736-1
- "The Rim of the Wheel" in Isaac Asimov's Science Fiction Magazine, (February 1984) collected in Isaac Asimov’s Fantasy!, (1985), Dial, ISBN 0-385-23017-6 (reprinted 1989 Ace Books, ISBN 0-441-05499-4)
- "From the Labyrinth of Night" in Isaac Asimov's Science Fiction Magazine (August 1984)
- "Upon This Shoal of Time" in Amazing Stories (March 1985)
- "Where Is Thy Victory?" in Isaac Asimov's Science Fiction Magazine (November 1985)
- "The King Under the Water" in Borderland #3 (1985)
- "Pleasure Palace" in Amazing Stories, (November 1986)
- "Out of Darkness" in Isaac Asimov's Science Fiction Magazine (April 1987), collected in Sea Serpents! (1989), Ace Books, ISBN 0-441-75682-4
- "The Test of Gold" in Alternate Generals (1998) Baen Books, ISBN 0-671-87886-7
- "The Blood of the Lamb" in The Time of the Vampires, (1996) DAW ISBN 0-88677-693-7
- "Cold As Fire" in Murder Most Medieval: Noble Tales of Ignoble Demises (2000), Cumberland House Publishing, ISBN 1-58182-087-9
- "The Muse" in Realms of Fantasy (February 2002)
- "A Rose With All Its Thorns" in Past Lives, Present Tense (2002) Ace Books, ISBN 0-441-00904-2
- "The Eye of the Beholder" in The World's Finest Mystery and Crime Stories III (2002), Forge Books, ISBN 0-7653-0235-7
- "A Mimicry of Mockingbirds" in White House Pet Detectives: Tales of Crime and Mystery at the White House from a Pet's Eye View (2002), Cumberland House Publishing, ISBN 1-58182-243-X
- "The Rag and Bone Man" in Murder Most Catholic: Divine Tales of Profane Crimes (2002), Cumberland House Publishing, ISBN 1-58182-260-X
- "A Dish of Poison" in Much Ado About Murder (2002), Berkley Publishing, ISBN 0-425-18650-4
- "A Mimicry of Mockingbirds" in The World's Finest Mystery and Crime Stories IV (2003), Forge Books, ISBN 0-7653-0848-7
- "The Eye of the Beholder" in Death by Horoscope, (2003), Carroll & Graf, ISBN 0-7867-1153-1
- "Sardines for Tea" in Kittens, Cats and Crimes (2003), Five Star Mystery Series, ISBN 0-7862-5032-1
- "A Stake of Holly" in Death by Dickens (2004), Berkley Prime Crime, ISBN 0-425-19947-9
- "The Necromancer's Apprentice" in Murder By Magic (2004), Aspect, ISBN 0-446-67962-3
- "The Blood of the Lamb" in The Time of the Vampires (2004), iBooks Inc., ISBN 0-7434-8733-8
- "The Necromancer's Apprentice" in The Adventure of the Missing Detective and 25 of the Year's Finest Crime and Mystery Stories, (2005) Carroll & Graf, ISBN 0-7867-1643-6
- "Way Down in Egypt's Land" in Thou Shalt Not Kill (2005), Carroll & Graf, ISBN 0-7867-1575-8
- "Over the Sea from Skye" in Alternate Generals III (2005), Baen Books, ISBN 0-7434-9897-6
- "The Diamonds of Golkonda" in Cross Plains Universe (2006), Monkey Brain Press and the Fandom Association of Central Texas. ISBN 978-1-932265-22-4.
- "The Avalon Psalter" in The Dimension Next Door (2008), Daw Books. ISBN 978-0-7564-0509-0.

=== Short non-fiction ===
- "It was Gorilla Warfare to Some Students" in Smithsonian Magazine (June 1982), reprinted in Readers as Writers, Holt, Rinehart, Winston (1986)
- "The Roots of Fantasy" in Empire, (1985)
- "Pandering, Evasions, and Target Practice" (co-author) in Amazing Stories (January 1989)
- "Scotch Mist" Mystery Scene (October 1990)
- "Re-Writing Your Career" in Novelists' Ink (June 1995)
- "Through Darkest Adolescence with Lois McMaster Bujold, or Thank You, But I already Have a Life" in Dreamweaver's Dilemma (1995)
- "Print-on-Demand Publishing: Hope or Hype" in Novelists' Ink (December 2000)
- "Blending Imagation and Reality in Fort Worth" Mystery Readers Journal (Winter 2000)
- "Location, Location, Location" on BookSense.com (October 2001)
- "Building Characters" in Writing Exciting audio series, Timberwolf Press (2002)
- "Plotting and Planning" in Writing Exciting audio series, Timberwolf Press (2002)
- "Dorothy's Dreadful Dinner" in A Second Helping of Murder Poisoned Pen Press (2003)
- "Writing a Spiritual Thriller" in Mystery Reader's Journal (Spring 2004)
- "Life is Brief, Art is Long" in Mystery Reader's Journal (Spring 2005)
- "Nessie on the Half-Shell" in Mystery Scene (Fall 2007)
- "A Chapel of Un-ease in Scotland" in Mystery Scene (Fall 2007)
- "A Scandal in Academia" in Mystery Reader's Journal (Fall 2007)
- "Be-mused by the Past" in Mystery Reader's Journal (Spring 2008)
