= Lazy Dragon Con =

Three-day relaxacon

- Status: Inactive
- Genre: Relaxacon
- Venue: Quality Inn McKinney
- Locations: McKinney, Texas
- Country: USA
- Years active: 2007 to 2008
- Inaugurated: 2007
- Most recent: 2008
- Organizer: Lazy Dragon LLC
- Filing status: For Profit
- Website: https://web.archive.org/web/20080820064757/http://www.lazydragon.com/con

Lazy Dragon Con was a three-day relaxacon held in McKinney, Texas, a northern suburb of Dallas in both 2007 and 2008. Lazy Dragon Con was sponsored by Lazy Dragon LLC, dealers of blades "From Pocketknives to Broadswords," and was not related to the Atlanta-based Dragon Con in any way.

Lazy Dragon Con was a party-oriented convention with informal/minimal programming. This programming included gaming, contests, a dealers' room, video room, parties, and more. Organizers describe the event as "a weekend-long party with friends." The convention provided a relaxed environment for people who enjoy science fiction to meet new friends and talk about their interests.

== Past conventions ==
Lazy Dragon Con (2007) - The first Lazy Dragon Con event was held August 3–5, 2007, at the Holiday Inn McKinney. The hotel is located at 1300 North Central Expressway, McKinney, TX 75069. Notable media guests included Guest of Honor Peter Mayhew plus Bill Johnson, James Hampton, and Burton Gilliam. Other notable guests included artist/author and creator of The Crow James O'Barr, singer/songwriter Sarah Gillmore, artist Brad W. Foster, authors Mari Atherton and Gloria Oliver, plus artists Jake Nealis, Jay Ewald, Gwynn Farrith, and Katy Dehay. The Fan Guests of Honor were Joseph Marchione and Christopher David Neathery. The convention also honored Lee Martindale as Author Guest of Honor Who Won't Be Coming for her assistance with the event. The 2007 Lazy Dragon Fun-Jell Wrestling Champion was Kari Watkins of Plano, Texas. The event raised over $1600 to benefit the Breast Cancer Research Foundation.

Lazy Dragon Con (2008) - The second Lazy Dragon Con was held July 18–20, 2008, at the Quality Inn McKinney. The hotel, a former Holiday Inn, is located at 1300 North Central Expressway, McKinney, TX 75069. Notable guests included Author Guest of Honor Lee Martindale, Fan Guest of Honor James "Jazz Man" Savage, actor Richard Kiel, actor James Hampton, singer/songwriter Sarah Gillmore, comics artist/author James O'Barr, author John Moore, and artist Gwynn "Starrydance" Farrith. A silent auction and other events were held to raise money and awareness for the Breast Cancer Research Foundation.

== Future conventions ==
The organizers announced on their website in 2009 that there would be no future Lazy Dragon Con events.
