= Julie Caitlin Brown =

American actress and singer (born 1961)

- Brown at Dragon Con in 2026
- Born: January 27, 1961 (age 65); San Francisco, California, US
- Other names: Caitlin Brown; JCB (nickname)
- Occupations: Actress, musician
- Spouse(s): Raymond Brown (m. 1979; div. 19??) Craig Damon (m. 1998; div. 2013)
- Children: 2

Julie Caitlin Brown (née Andrich; born January 27, 1961) is an American actress and singer known for her role as Na'Toth in the first and fifth season of the science fiction television series Babylon 5.

== Career ==
Her first stage role was as Mary Magdalene in a 1983 professional production of Jesus Christ Superstar. In the late 1980s, Brown branched out into commercial and television work in Florida; in 1990 she moved to New York City where she appeared in Williamstown Theatre Festival production of A Funny Thing Happened on the Way to the Forum and Broadway production of Grand Hotel.

In 1992, Brown moved back to California and appeared in guest-starring roles on several series. Following the departure of Mary Woronov from the series and the last-minute loss of originally cast Susan Kellermann, Babylon 5's casting director called her and unexpectedly offered her the role of Na'Toth on the first season of the science-fiction series.

Brown appeared in five episodes and declined to stay for a second season. The role of Na'Toth was recast with Mary Kay Adams, and Brown went on to return for guest appearances during the second season (as a human lawyer in "There All the Honor Lies") and the fifth season. ("A Tragedy of Telepaths" reprising the role of Na'Toth)

Brown's other television guest credits include Becker, JAG, Beverly Hills, 90210, Star Trek: Deep Space Nine (in the episode "The Passenger") and Star Trek: The Next Generation (in the episodes "Gambit 1" and "Gambit 2"). She played the Kromagg Leader in the 1999 Sliders episode (5/11) "Requiem". In 2009, she portrayed Tammy Tennis in Joshua Grannell's comedy horror film All About Evil. In 2010, she wrote, produced and starred in the short film Thoughts of Suicide on an Otherwise Lovely Day.

Also a singer, Brown's first CD, Sheddin' My Skin, was released in January 1998. Her second album, Struck by Lightning, came out July 2002.
