= The Winter King (Carl novel) =

The Winter King is a 1986 novel written by Lillian Stewart Carl.

== Plot summary ==
The Winter King is a novel in which the next generation is the focus. The titular character, a young prince, is forced into exile when his empire is invaded by nomads aided by treason. His nomadic counterpart also faces exile due to betrayal within his own people. Between them stands the daughter of the Queen of Sabazel, who must establish her rule and chooses to love both men, eventually bearing a child from each, one of whom becomes heir to Sabazel.

== Reception ==
John T. Sapienza, Jr. reviewed Sabazel and The Winter King for Different Worlds magazine and stated that "As a literary question, what interested me the most was how the author handles the battle of the sexes. Each of these novels is the story of young people learning their early lessons about the other sex, in the course of dealing with the chaos of war. What she has to say with well worth reading, and I'm looking forward to the next generation."

== Reviews ==
- Review by Rick Osborn (1986) in Fantasy Review, November 1986
