= MarsCon (Virginia) =

Science fiction convention held in Williamsburg and Va Beach, VA, USA

- MarsCon logo
- Status: Active
- Genre: Science fiction
- Location: Virginia Beach, Virginia
- Country: United States
- Inaugurated: 1990
- Website: marscon.net

MarsCon in Virginia Beach, Virginia is a mid-sized regional science fiction convention founded in 1990. The convention provides a relaxed environment for people who enjoy science fiction to meet new friends and talk about their interests. The convention has been described as "the largest and longest-running science fiction/fantasy convention in the Tidewater area."

== History ==
The history of MarsCon begins with an earlier convention known as Sci-Con, a well established, general science fiction convention in Virginia Beach, Virginia. In 1990 the people who worked every year to bring Sci-Con together held a low key relaxicon or "relaxing convention" for its members. After the first year, this new convention was re-christened MarsCon in honor of a long-standing fake bid to host the World Science Fiction Convention on the planet Mars in 2095.

With a focus on relaxation and camaraderie, MarsCon hosts a variety of convention activities including panel discussions and workshop activities, gaming (including role-playing games, and card games), a video room with anime, a dealers room, annual tea party, auction for charity, and an art show.

== Conventions ==
=== Upcoming ===
- MarsCon 2027: Quarks and Quandaries will be held January 15–17, 2027, at the Holiday Inn Virginia Beach - Norfolk in Virginia Beach, Virginia. The Author Guest of Honor is Robert J. Sawyer. The Media Guest of Honor is Jacob Pauwels. The Gaming Guest of Honor is Steve Jackson. Author Guests include Wayland Smith, Gray Rinehart, C.V. Walter and Phillip Pournelle. Costuming/Cosplay Guest – Katsumi Cosplay.

=== Past ===
- MarsCon 1996 was held January 12–14, 1996, at the George Washington Inn in Williamsburg, VA.
- MarsCon 1997 was held January 10–12, 1997, at the Ramada Inn Historic (formerly the George Washington Inn) in Williamsburg, VA.
- MarsCon 2002 was held January 11–13, 2002, at the former Ramada Inn and Conference Center in Williamsburg, VA. $1800 was raised for the Heritage Humane Society. Additionally, the Con Suite Bean Jar also raised $87 for the Police and Firefighter's 9-11 fund.
- MarsCon 2003 was held January 24–26, 2003 at the Clarion Hotel (formerly the Ramada Inn), Williamsburg, VA.
- MarsCon 2004 was held January 23–25, 2004 at the Clarion Hotel, Williamsburg, VA. The convention raised $1875 through the charity auction for the Heritage Humane Society.
- MarsCon 2005 was held January 21–23, 2005 at the Clarion Hotel, Williamsburg, VA. The US Military had booked rooms at the hotel and, due to a shift in scheduling, the hotel cut the 300 room block it had promised to the Con. The convention raised over $2000 for the local Heritage Humane Society.
- MarsCon 2006 was held January 20–22, 2006, at the Holiday Inn Patriot in Williamsburg, VA.
- MarsCon 2007 was held January 19–21, 2007, at the Holiday Inn Patriot in Williamsburg, VA.
- MarsCon 2008 January 18–20, 2008, at the Holiday Inn Patriot in Williamsburg, VA.
- MarsCon 2009 was held January 16–18, 2009, at the Holiday Inn Patriot in Williamsburg. The convention's theme was "steampunk" and author John Ringo was the guest of honor. Other notable guests included writer and publisher Toni Weisskopf, artist and author Ron Miller, game designer Steve Long, and members of the 501st Legion.
- MarsCon 2010 was held January 15–17, 2010, at the Holiday Inn Patriot in Williamsburg. The convention was the focus of the January 19, 2010, edition of The Adventures of Cynical Woman webcomic.
- MarsCon 2011 was held January 14–16, 2011, at the Holiday Inn Patriot in Williamsburg. Notable guests included author Jim Butcher, author Shannon Butcher, artist Ursula Vernon, cartoonist Rob Balder, writer Keith R. A. DeCandido, and author Andrew Fox. Convention attendance was estimated at 983 members with at least $2500 raised for the Heritage Humane Society, the event's designated charity.
- MarsCon 2012 was held January 13–16, 2012, at the Holiday Inn Patriot in Williamsburg. The convention's theme is "It's the end of the MarsCon as we know it", playing off both the "Mayan apocalypse" predicted by some for 2012 and the R.E.M. song "It's the End of the World as We Know It (And I Feel Fine)". MarsCon 2012 raised close to $3000.00 for The Heritage Humane Society.
- MarsCon 2013 was held January 18-20, 2013, at the Crowne Plaza Williamsburg at Ft. Magruder, Williamsburg, Virginia. The convention's theme was "Rebirth". Over 1,000 attendees joined MarsCon.
- MarsCon 2014: A Twisted Fairy Tale was held January 17–19, 2014, at the Fort Magruder Hotel and conference Center. Notable guests included author Jim C. Hines and author Carrie Ryan. The convention raised more than $5,000 for the Heritage Humane Society, the event's designated charity.
- MarsCon 2015: 25 Shades of MarsCon was held January 16–18, 2015, at the Fort Magruder Hotel and Conference Center. This is the 25th anniversary for MarsCon. Some of our favorite former guests (shades of conventions passed) will be returning, including David Weber, Katherine Kurtz, David B. Coe, and D.B. Jackson. The convention will once again be supporting our the Heritage Humane Society, the event's designated charity, with an auction on Saturday evening which raised $4305 for Heritage Humane.
- MarsCon 2016: Sweet '16 Celebrating Women in Science Fiction was held January 15–17, 2016, at the DoubleTree by Hilton Hotel in Williamsburg, Virginia. The guest of honor was Ellen Kushner. The convention once again supported the Heritage Humane Society, the event's designated charity, with an auction on Saturday evening.
- MarsCon 2017: Year of the Dragon was held January 13–15, 2017, at the DoubleTree by Hilton Hotel in Williamsburg, Virginia. The guests of honor were Todd J. McCaffrey (Writer), Ruth Thompson (Artist), Carla Brindle (Fan), Mari Mancusi (YA Writer), Mikey Mason (Musical)
- MarsCon 2018: Werewolves of MarsCon was held January 12–14, 2018, at the DoubleTree by Hilton Hotel in Williamsburg, Virginia. The guests of honor were Carrie Vaughn (Writer), Tim Shinn (Artist), Julie Wall (Fan), Maria V. Snyder (YA Writer), The Blibbering Humdingers (Musical), Tonya Woldridge (Gaming)
- MarsCon 2019: Land of the Faerie was held January 18-20th, 2019, at the DoubleTree by Hilton Hotel in Williamsburg, Virginia. The guests of honor this year were Seanan McGuire (Writer), Catherynne M. Valente (YA Writer), Meredith Dillman (Artist) and Valentine Wolfe (Musical).
- MarsCon 2020: Rogues and Rebels was held January 17–19, 2020, at the DoubleTree by Hilton Hotel in Williamsburg, Virginia. The guests of honor were Scott Lynch (Writer), David Weber (Special), Charles Urbach (Artist), Leslye Penelope (YA Writer), John Wick (Gaming) and Jonah Knight (Musical). Attendance - 1452. The convention, once again, supported the Heritage Humane Society with an auction (which raised $4039 with more coming in) on Saturday evening.
- MarsCon 2021, scheduled for January 15–17, 2021, was cancelled due to Coronavirus concerns.
- MarsCon 2022: Myths & Legends was held March 18–20, 2022 (postponed from January 14–16, 2022), at the DoubleTree by Hilton Hotel in Williamsburg, Virginia. The guests of honor were Peter V Brett (Writer), Phillip Pournelle (Special), Kaysha Siemens (Artist), David Weber (Special). Attendance - <pending>.
- MarsCon 2023: Witches and Warlocks was held on January 13–15, 2023, at the Holiday Inn Virginia Beach - Norfolk in Virginia Beach, Virginia. The guests of honor were D. J. Butler (Writer), Chaz Kemp (Artist), Katie Cross (YA Author). Attendance - approx 900.
- MarsCon 2024: Marso's Monster Mayhem was held January 12–14, 2024, at the Holiday Inn Virginia Beach - Norfolk in Virginia Beach, Virginia. The guests of honor were Larry Correia (Writer), and Mera Rose (Costuming). Attendance - approx 800. The convention, once again, supported the Heritage Humane Society with an auction (which raised $3467).
- MarsCon 2025: Galactic Empires & Epic Interstellar Legends (aka MarsCon 35) was held January 17–19, 2025, at the Holiday Inn Virginia Beach - Norfolk in Virginia Beach, Virginia. The guests were Christopher Ruocchio and Cassandra Rose Clarke (co-guests of honor), Stephen Buonocore (Gaming Guest of Honor), Jake Clark (Artist Guest of Honor) and Alyssa Yeager (Musician Guest of Honor).
- MarsCon 2026: Secrets and Scales was held January 16–18, 2026, at the Holiday Inn Virginia Beach - Norfolk in Virginia Beach, Virginia. Author Lisa Shearin was the guest of honor; Connie Vogelmann was the Gaming Guest of Honor; Keegan Eichelman was the YA/Lit RPG Guest of Honor; Stephen Burks was the Artist Guest of Honor; Keith R.A. DeCandido was the Featured Author.
