= Linda Ravenscroft =

- Born: 1963 (age 62–63); Cheshire, England
- Occupations: Artist and author
- Website: Official website

Linda Ravenscroft (born 1963 in Cheshire, England) is a self-taught artist and author best known for her paintings and drawings of fantasy subjects. Her work is influenced by William Morris and his contemporaries, as well by more modern illustrators such as Brian Froud. Ravenscroft became a professional artist in 1994 after the birth of her son, Dorian. Her first prints were published in 1998; since then, she has been featured in many Fantasy/Fairy Art books and illustrated and written several tutorial Faerie Art books, such as How to Draw and Paint Fairies (2005). Ravenscroft's work has been widely featured on cards and calendars. In 2013, Linda opened up a gallery, named "The Mystic Garden" after one of her early works, in Glastonbury, Somerset, which she runs with her husband, John.

== Bibliography ==
- Moore, Barbara; Ravenscroft, Linda (2007). A Guide to Mystic Faerie Tarot. Woodbury, MN: Llewellyn. ISBN 978-0-7387-0921-5.
- Ravenscroft, Linda (2005). How To Draw and Paint Fairies. New York: Watson Guptil. ISBN 978-0-8230-2383-7.
- Ravenscroft, Linda (2008). How To Draw and Paint Fairyland. Tunbridge Wells: Search. ISBN 978-1-84448-350-1.
- Ravenscroft, Linda (2009). Enchanted: The Faerie and Fantasy Art of Linda Ravenscroft. Wisley, Surrey: AAPPL. ISBN 978-1-904332-88-6.
- Ravenscroft, Linda (2009). The Fairy Artists Figure Drawing Bible]. Tunbridge Wells: Search. ISBN 978-1-84448-437-9.
