= FenCon =

Convention

- FenCon logo
- Status: Active
- Genre: Science fiction
- Venue: Westin Dallas/Fort Worth Airport Hotel
- Locations: Dallas, Texas
- Country: United States
- Inaugurated: 2004
- Attendance: 850+ (2013)
- Organizer: Dallas Future Society
- Filing status: 501(c)(3)
- Website: www.fencon.org

FenCon is a literary science fiction and fantasy convention with filk held each year in or around Dallas, Texas. The name is derived from "fen", the fannish plural of "fan", and "con", an abbreviation for "convention".

FenCon is a production of the Dallas Future Society, a non-profit 501(c)(3) corporation that seeks to promote the advancement of science, literature, and music for all mankind. This is the same organization that has run WhoFest, a Doctor Who-focused media-oriented science fiction convention, since 2013.

== Programming ==
Notable features of FenCon include science programming, writing panels, fan discussions, gaming, a diverse selection of guests, an art show and auction, a dealers room, youth and adult short story contests, a writers workshop, "FenKids" children's programming, and the FenCon Saturday Night Cabaret.

While not a filk music convention, FenCon is noted for its quantity and variety of filk programming, performances, and performers. The Texas Filk Page describes FenCon as "the premier filk event in Texas." The Dallas Observer has called FenCon "the region's hottest fan-run literary sci-fi and fantasy convention". but "you don't have to be a bookworm to enjoy this jam-packed weekend of guests, music, films, television, workshops and games."

FenCon was named one of the "Best Literary and Book Events in D/FW" by KTVT in August 2011. The CBS affiliate cited FenCon as "the place to be this September". Tor.com notes that FenCon has "quickly established an enviable reputation among regular convention goers".

In addition to the educational and social aspects of FenCon, an external charity of interest to the membership is chosen each year to be the beneficiary of an annual charity auction and limited-edition cover art print sale. FenCon absorbs all the costs associated with creating these art prints so the entire donation goes directly to the designated charity. As of FenCon X, more than $22,000 has been raised for these charities.

In 2007, FenCon IV hosted the 2007 Lone Star Shindig, a Texas-wide gathering of Firefly fans. The Shindig is a convention within a convention, hosted each year by a different local group each year. In 2009, FenCon VI hosted the Region Three Summit for Starfleet International, an annual gathering of Star Trek fans from Texas and Louisiana. In 2011, FenCon VIII served as DeepSouthCon 49, an annual gathering of science fiction fans from across the southeastern United States.

== Location ==
FenCon I through FenCon III were held at the Holiday Inn Select North Dallas, in Farmers Branch, Texas, just north of the Dallas city limits. As the membership increased and the programming expanded each year, more and more of the hotel's function space was used. By the end of FenCon III it was clear to the organizers that for the event to continue to grow the convention would have to relocate. FenCon IV through FenCon XI were held at the Crowne Plaza North Dallas in the northern Dallas suburb of Addison, Texas. Starting with FenCon XII, the convention will be held at the Westin Dallas/Fort Worth Airport Hotel in Irving, Texas.
