= Fan convention =

Gathering of fans of a topic

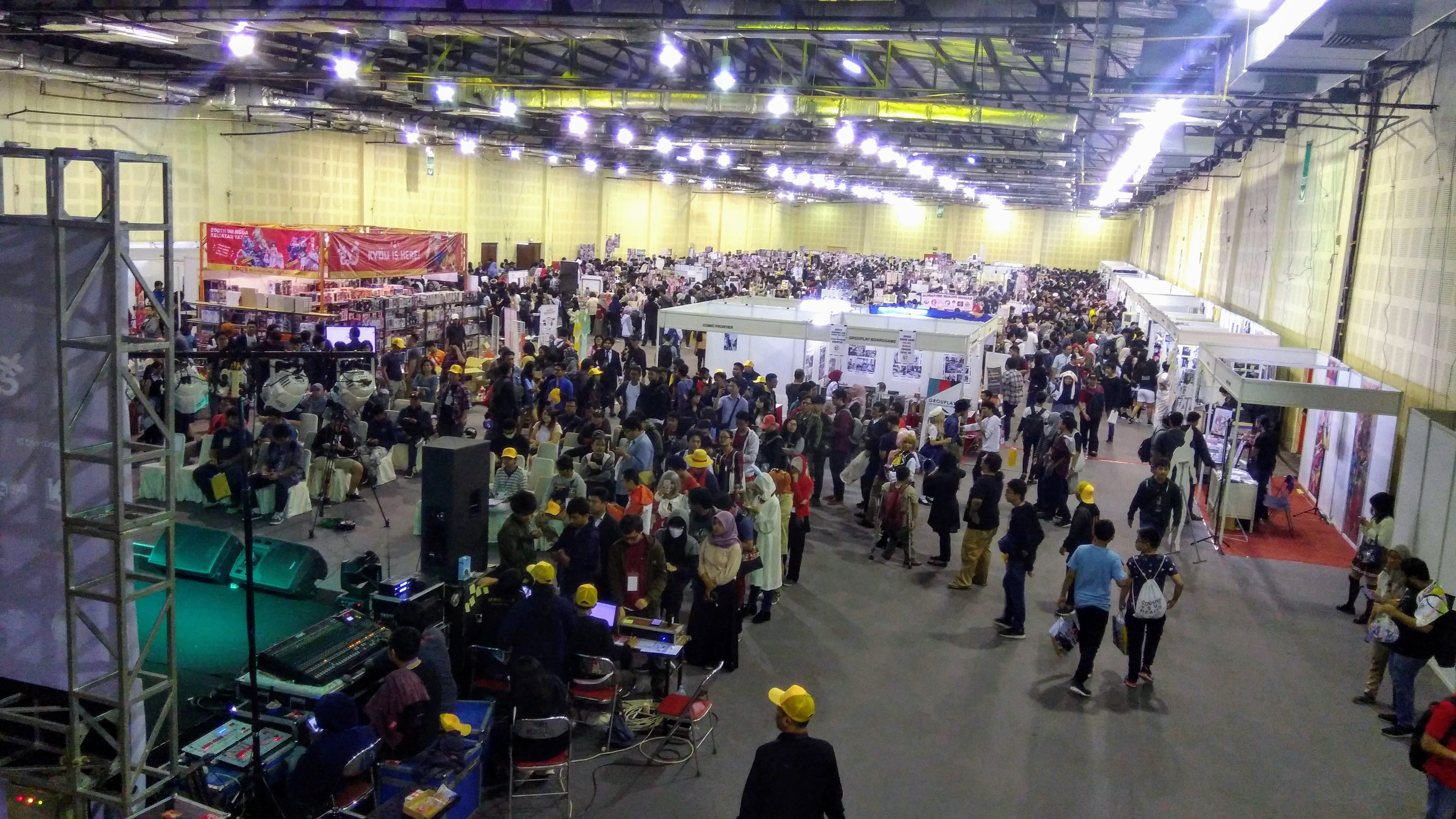
Comic Frontier, a doujinshi convention held in Jakarta, Indonesia

A fan convention (abbreviated con) is an event in which fans of a particular topic gather to participate in discussions and activities related to their shared interests. Fan conventions are typically organized around specific fandoms, genres, or media franchises, with distinct conventions dedicated to them. The concept of a fan convention has existed since at least 1942 and has evolved into an important part of modern popular culture.

Conventions can be grassroots events organized by volunteer fan communities on a nonprofit basis, commercial enterprises that generate profit through ticket sales and celebrity appearances, or both. Science fiction conventions, which emerged in the late 1930s, established the template that spawned numerous specialized convention types, including those dedicated to anime and manga, tabletop and video gaming, comics, and various subcultures like the furry fandom and the My Little Pony fandom (also known as the brony fandom).

The phenomenon experienced modest growth through the mid-20th century before expanding rapidly during the 1970s, when many of today's major events were established.

== Overview ==
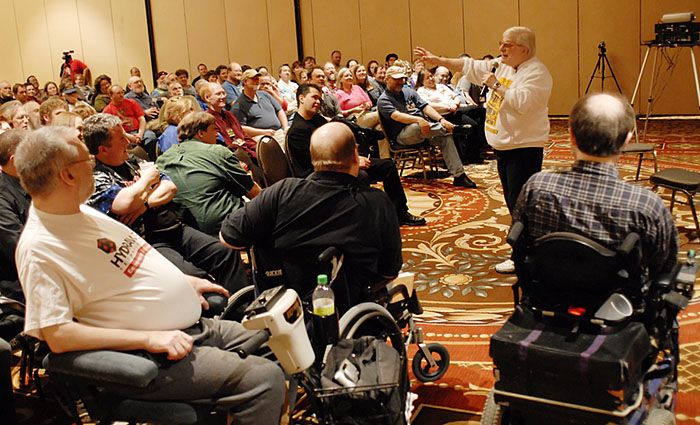
Harlan Ellison speaking at Minicon 41, April 13, 2006

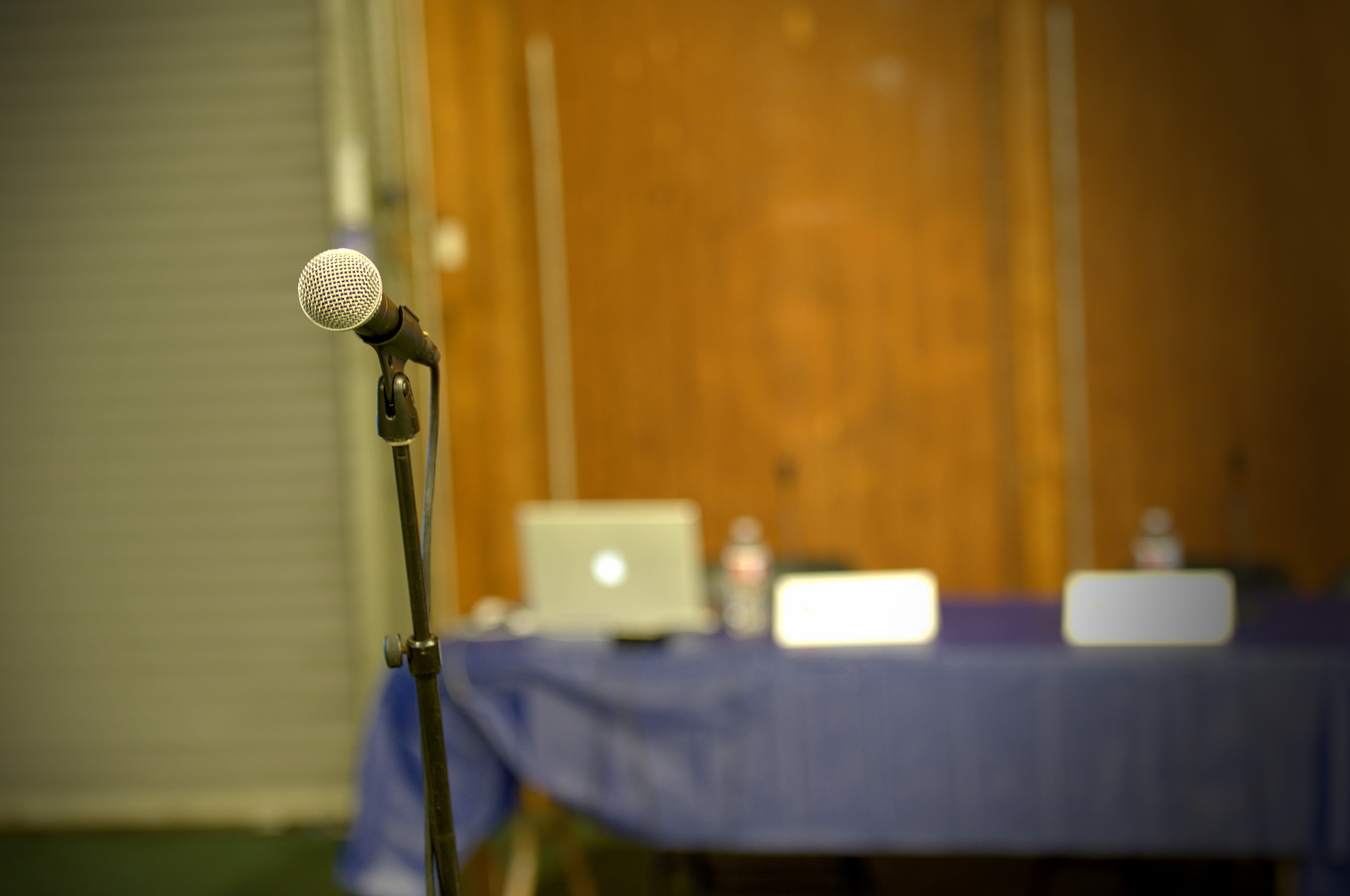
In fan conventions, the audience is sometimes invited to line up and ask questions using a dedicated microphone.

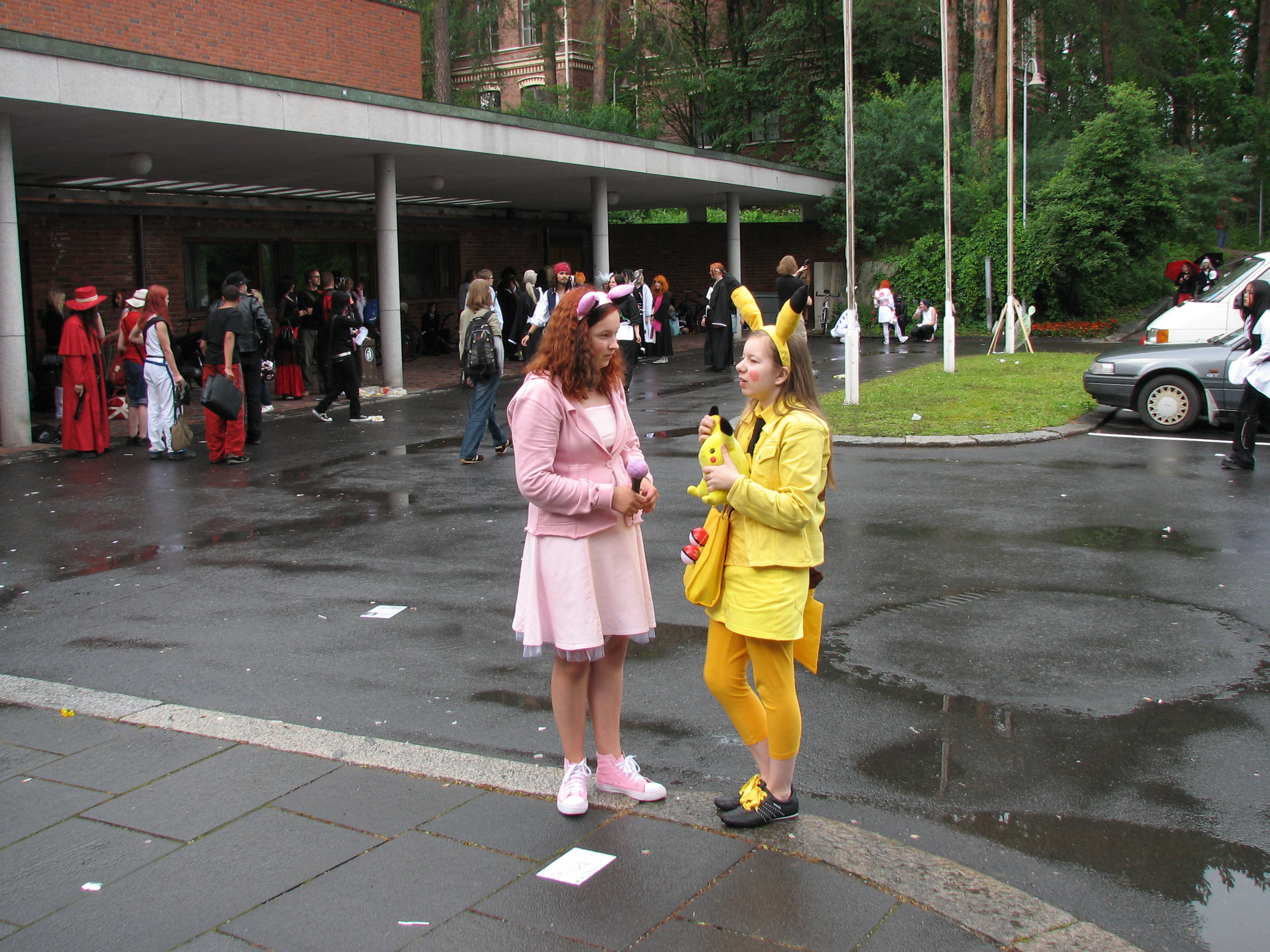
Two young women cosplaying as Pokemon characters Jigglypuff and Pikachu during the 2007 Animecon in Jyväskylä, Finland

The term fan convention dates back to at least 1942. Fan conventions are traditionally organized by fans on a not-for-profit basis, though some events catering to fans are run by commercial interests for profit. Many conventions have award presentations relating to their genre (such as the Hugo Awards which have been presented at Worldcon since 1953).

At commercial events, performers often give out autographs to the fans, sometimes in exchange for a flat appearance fee, and sometimes may perform songs that have no relevance to the shows or otherwise entertain the fans. Commercial conventions are usually quite expensive and are hosted in hotels. There is often tight security for the celebrities to protect against potentially fanatic fans. Such features are not common at traditional science-fiction conventions, which began in the late 1930s and are more oriented toward science fiction as a mode of literature, rather than toward visual media, and do not include any paid appearances by famous personalities, and maintain a less caste-like differentiation between professional and fan. Anime conventions, gaming conventions, filk-music conventions, and furry conventions may all be considered derivatives of science-fiction conventions.

While the wearing of costumes—and even a costume competition (known as a "masquerade")—has been an occasional feature of traditional science-fiction conventions since Morojo and Forrest J Ackerman wore them during the First World Science Fiction Convention in 1939, this has never been the dominant feature of such events. From press coverage of comic book and anime conventions has arisen the widespread image of fans' tendency to dress up as their favorite characters in elaborate costumes (known as cosplay) that are time-consuming and/or expensive to assemble.

Some media properties with particularly dedicated followings have spawned their own convention types. My Little Pony fan conventions (also called brony cons or pony cons) emerged in 2011 from the adult brony fandom surrounding the animated television series My Little Pony: Friendship Is Magic. Brony conventions offer various activities including panels, workshops, vendor halls, charity auctions, cosplay contests, and meet-and-greets with voice actors, writers, and other people involved in the production of the show. The first significant brony convention, BronyCon, was held in New York City in 2011 and initially attracted 100 attendees, but grew dramatically in subsequent years, reaching over 10,000 attendees in 2015 and 2019. As of 2025, despite the original television series ending in 2019, active My Little Pony conventions continue worldwide.

Other media franchises that had their own conventions include Star Trek (Treklanta) and Harry Potter (LeakyCon), though they are both now defunct.

== History ==
Fan conventions for various genres of entertainment extend to the first conventions held in the 1930s. However, while a few conventions were created in various parts of the world within the period between 1935–1960, the number of convention establishments increased slightly in the 1960s and then increased dramatically in the 1970s, with many of the largest conventions in the modern era being established during the latter decade. Impetuses for further establishment of local fan conventions include:

- The return of superhero characters and franchises during the Silver Age of Comic Books (1956–1970).
- Science fiction adaptations for television serials (e.g., Star Trek) in the 1960s–1970s.
- The growth of role-playing (in the 1970s and 1980s) as a genre of tabletop, live-action and eventually video/computer gaming, which not only inspired roleplay of favorite characters in full-body costumes but also inspired existing franchises to adapt their themes for said methods of gaming.
- The growth in home taping (starting with VHS in the late 1970s) of television broadcasts, including popular serials.
- The growth of computerized communication, including the Internet and Internet-dependent applications in the 1980s and 1990s.

== See also ==
- Fantasy fandom
- List of anime conventions
- List of comic book conventions
- List of fan conventions by date of founding
- List of furry conventions
- List of gaming conventions
- List of multi-genre conventions
- List of My Little Pony conventions
- List of professional wrestling conventions
- List of science-fiction conventions
- Science fiction fandom
