= List of science fiction conventions =

This is a list of notable science fiction conventions, as distinct from anime conventions, brony conventions, comic book conventions, furry conventions, gaming conventions, horror conventions, and multigenre conventions.

In the "type" column, "general" means the entire science fiction and fantasy culture; "literature", "media", etc. modify that. Horror is indicated separately.

convention	city	country or region	type	website	most recent or next scheduled date
Åcon	Mariehamn, Åland	Finland	general		2022-05-26
Ad Astra	Toronto, Ontario	Canada	general		2019-07-12
AggieCon	College Station, Texas	United States	general		2023-03-03
Albacon	Albany, New York	United States	general		2024-09-14
All-Con	Dallas, Texas	United States	general		2023-03-16
ApolloCon	Houston, Texas	United States	general		2015-06-19
Archon	St. Louis, Missouri	United States	general		2024-10-04
Arisia	Boston, Massachusetts	United States	general		2023-01-13
ArmadilloCon	Austin, Texas	United States	literature		2021-10-15
BabelCon	Baton Rouge, Louisiana	United States	general		2012-10-12
Balticon	Baltimore, Maryland	United States	general		2023-05-26
BayCon	Santa Clara, California	United States	general		2022-07-21
Boréal	Quebec City, Quebec	Canada	general		2018-05-04
Boskone	Boston, Massachusetts	United States	general		2023-02-19
BotCon	varies	United States	Transformers		2022-08-25
Bubonicon	Albuquerque, New Mexico	United States	general		2023-08-25
Capclave	Gaithersburg, Maryland	United States	general		2023-10-01
CAN-CON	Ottawa, Ontario	Canada	literature		2022-10-14
Capricon	Wheeling, Illinois	United States	general		2023-02-02
Chattacon	Chattanooga, Tennessee	United States	general		2023-01-13
CoastCon	Biloxi, Mississippi	United States	general		2023-03-03
Con†Stellation	Huntsville, Alabama	United States	general		2015-10-16
ConCarolinas	Concord, North Carolina	United States	general		2023-06-02
ConCoction	Cleveland, Ohio	United States	general, literature, media		2023-??-??
ConDFW	Dallas, Texas	United States	literature		2019-02-15
CONduit	Salt Lake City, Utah	United States	general, literature, media		2015-05-22
Conestoga	Tulsa, Oklahoma	United States	general		2010-04-23
Confluence	Pittsburgh, Pennsylvania	United States	general		2022-07-29
ConFusion	Detroit, Michigan	United States	general		2024-01-19
ConGlomeration	Louisville, Kentucky	United States	general		2020-04-10
ConQuesT	Kansas City, Missouri	United States	general		2023-06-02
Console Room	Minneapolis, Minnesota	United States	general		2025-01-31
CONtraflow	New Orleans, Louisiana	United States	general		2025-10-10
CONvergence	Minneapolis, Minnesota	United States	general		2025-07-03
Con-Version	Calgary, Alberta	Canada	general		2010-10-15
Comikaze Expo	Los Angeles, California	United States	general		2014-10-31
COSine	Colorado Springs, Colorado	United States	general, literature, science		2025-01-24
DeepCon	Fiuggi Fonte, Frosinone	Italy	general		2023-03-16
DemiCon	Des Moines, Iowa	United States	general		2023-05-05
Dimension Jump	Nottingham, England	United Kingdom	Red Dwarf		2021-09-21
Disclave	Washington, D.C.	United States	general		1997-05-23
Diversicon	Saint Paul, Minnesota	United States	general		2023-07-14
Dragon Con	Atlanta, Georgia	United States	general		2023-08-31
Eastercon	varies	United Kingdom	general		2023-04-07
EerieCon	Grand Island, New York	United States	general, horror		2016-09-30
Eurocon	varies	Europe	general		2020-10-02
Fan Expo (formerly Wizard World)	varies	United States	media		2023-01-06
Fanaticon	Dothan, Alabama	United States	general		2019-10-06
F.A.C.T.S.	Ghent	Belgium	general		2023-04-01
Fantasticon	Copenhagen	Denmark	general		2023-06-02
Farpoint Convention	Hunt Valley, Maryland	United States	general, media		2023-02-10
FedCon	Düsseldorf	Germany	general		2023-05-26
FenCon	Dallas, Texas	United States	general		2022-09-16
Festival fantazie	Chotěboř	Czech Republic	general		2024-06-28
Finncon	varies	Finland	general		2023-07-07
For the Love of Sci-Fi	Manchester	United Kingdom	general		2023-12-02
Galaxy Science Fiction Convention	Chengdu, Sichuan	China	general		2025-09-19
Gallifrey One	Los Angeles, California	United States	Doctor Who		2023-02-17
Gatecon	Vancouver, British Columbia	Canada	television series		2022-09-01
Gaylaxicon	Atlanta, Georgia	United States	general (LGBTQ+)		2023-03-17
Geek.Kon	Madison, Wisconsin	United States	general		2015-08-21
GenCon	Indianapolis, Indiana	United States	general		2023-08-03
Générations Star Wars et Science Fiction	Cusset	France	Star Wars		2023-04-29
G-Fest	Rosemont, Illinois	United States	Japanese monsters		2023-07-14
Hal-Con	Halifax, Nova Scotia	Canada	general		2024-11-08
Hypericon	Nashville, Tennessee	United States	general		2018-07-06
Icecon	Reykjavík	Iceland	general		2020-11-06
Icon	Cedar Rapids, Iowa	United States	general		2015-10-16
ICon festival	Tel Aviv	Israel	general		2024-10-20
I-CON	Hempstead, New York	United States	general		2014-03-08
InConJunction	Indianapolis, Indiana	United States	general		2016-07-01
JordanCon	Atlanta, Georgia	United States	general		2018-04-20
Lazy Dragon Con	McKinney, Texas	United States	general		2008-07-18
LepreCon	Phoenix, Arizona	United States	general		2016-06-23
Life, the Universe, & Everything	Provo, Utah	United States	academic		2016-02-11
Linucon	Austin, Texas	United States	general		2005-09-30
Lunacon	Rye Brook, New York	United States	general		2016-03-18
Maleyevka seminars	Saint Petersburg	Soviet Union/Russia	general, literature		2015-04-23
Marcon	Columbus, Ohio	United States	general		2023-05-26
MarsCon	Bloomington, Minnesota	United States	general		2025-03-07
MarsCon	Williamsburg, Virginia	United States	general		2016-01-15
MediaWest*Con	Lansing, Michigan	United States	general		2015-05-22
MegaCon	Orlando, Florida	United States	general		2015-04-10
Microcon	Exeter, England	United Kingdom	general		2013-02-23
MidSouthCon	Memphis, Tennessee	United States	general		2015-03-20
Midwestcon	Cincinnati, Ohio	United States	relaxacon		2015-06-25
MileHiCon	Denver, Colorado	United States	general		2025-10-31
Minicon	Minneapolis, Minnesota	United States	general		2025-04-18
MOBICON	Mobile, Alabama	United States	general		2015-05-22
MomoCon	Atlanta, Georgia	United States	general		2015-05-28
Multiverse	Atlanta, GA	United States	general		2022-10-14
MystiCon	Roanoke, Virginia	United States	general		2016-02-26
SFWA Nebula Conference	varies	United States	general		2018-05-17
NecronomiCon Providence	Providence, Rhode Island	United States	horror		2024-08-15
New Zealand NatCon	varies	New Zealand	general		2019
Nihon SF Taikai	Takamatsu, Kagawa	Japan	general		2021-08-21
North American Science Fiction Convention	varies	United States	general		2014-07-17
Norwescon	Seattle, Washington	United States	general		2015-04-05
Novacon	Nottingham, England	United Kingdom	general		2015-11-13
Octocon	Dublin	Ireland	general		2015-10-10
OryCon	Portland, Oregon	United States	general		2024-10-18
Outlantacon	Atlanta, Georgia	United States	general		2015-05-08
Penguicon	Southfield, Michigan	United States	general		2022-04-22
Philcon	Cherry Hill, New Jersey	United States	general		2023-11-17
Polcon	varies	Poland	general		2015-08-27
Pyrkon	Poznań	Poland	general		2024-06-14
RadCon	Pasco, Washington	United States	general		2018-02-16
RavenCon	Richmond, Virginia	United States	general		2015-04-24
Readercon	Quincy, Massachusetts	United States	literature		2023-07-13
Rhode Island Comic Con	Providence, Rhode Island	United States	general		2018-11-02
Sci-Fi Valley Con	Altoona, Pennsylvania	United States	general, horror		2017-06-09
Sci-Fi on the Rock	St. John's, Newfoundland and Labrador	Canada	general		2015-04-24
SFContario	Toronto, Ontario	Canada	general		2018-11-16
SFeraKon	Zagreb	Croatia	general		2015-05-15
ShadowCon	Memphis, Tennessee	United States	SCA		2015-01-09
Soonercon	Norman, Oklahoma	United States	general		2022-06-24
SpoCon	Spokane, Washington	United States	general		2018-08-10
Star Wars Celebration	Chicago, Illinois	United States	Star Wars		2019-04-11
Starbase Indy	Indianapolis, Indiana	United States	Star Trek		2025-11-28
STARFLEET International Conference	Niagara Falls, New York	United States	Star Trek		2015-08-21
Stellarcon	Greensboro, North Carolina	United States	general		2013-03-01
SwanCon	Perth, Western Australia	Australia	general		2015-04-02
Swecon	varies	Sweden	general		2020-03-20
TimeGate	Atlanta, Georgia	United States	Doctor Who		2015-05-22
Treklanta	Atlanta, Georgia	United States	Star Trek		2016-04-15
Trinoc*coN	Durham, North Carolina	United States	general		2009-07-03
TusCon	Tucson, Arizona	United States	general, horror		2015-10-30
UnCommonCon	Dallas, Texas	United States	general		2000-11-24
Unicon	Maryland	United States	general		1989-07-16
VCON	Lower Mainland, British Columbia	Canada	general		2018-10-05
Vericon	Cambridge, Massachusetts	United States	general		2014-03-21
Visions	Rosemont, Illinois	United States	Doctor Who		1998-11-29
Westercon	varies	United States	general		2022-07-01
WillyCon	Wayne, Nebraska	United States	general		2017-03-31
Windycon	Lombard, Illinois	United States	general		2022-11-11
WisCon	Madison, Wisconsin	United States	general		2022-05-27
WonderCon	Los Angeles, California	United States	general		2023-03-24
World Fantasy Convention	varies	varies	fantasy		2023-10-26
Worldcon	varies	world	general		2023-08-16
