= Swecon =

Swedish annual science fiction and fantasy convention

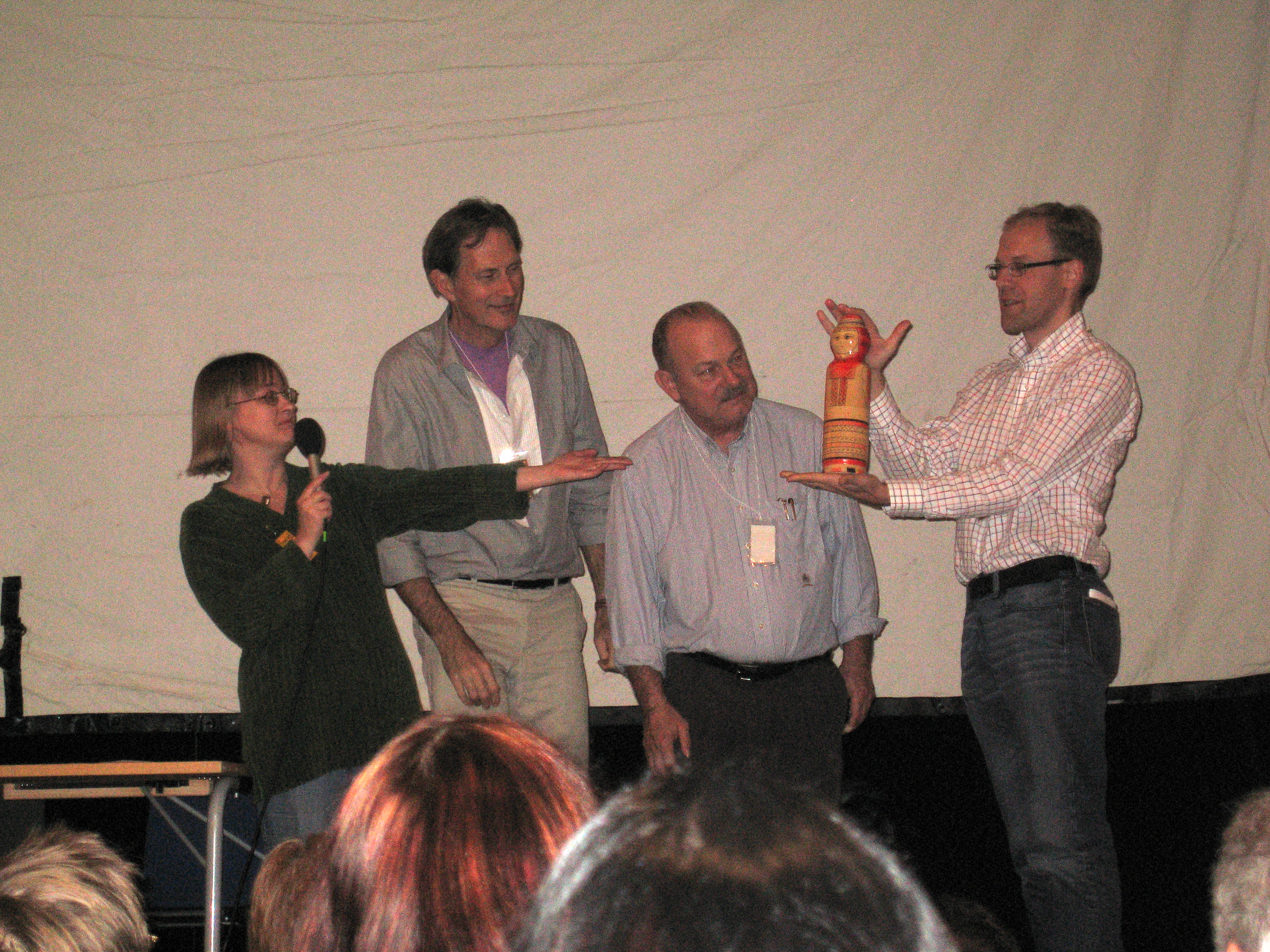
The "spirit" of Swecon being handed over. Ylva Spångberg, Geoff Ryman, Joe Haldeman and Martin Andreasson at Imagicon, Swecon, 2006 in Stockholm.

Swecon is a title annually awarded to a Swedish science fiction convention.

Since 1998, one Swedish science fiction convention per year has been elected to host national awards in science fiction and has been awarded the title "Swecon" in addition to its actual name. Swecon is usually the largest Swedish science fiction convention in any given year.

The name "Swecon" is part of a larger tradition and similar conventions are held in Norway, Denmark and Finland under the names: Norcon, Dancon and Finncon.

== List of Swecons ==
| | Year | Location | Name | Guest(s) of Honour |
|---|---|---|---|---|
| 1 | 1998 | Linköping | ConFuse 98 | Paul J. McAuley |
| 2 | 1999 | Uppsala | Upsala: 1999 | Michael Swanwick |
| 3 | 2000 | Stockholm | NasaCon 2000 | Brian M. Stableford, John-Henri Holmberg |
| 4 | 2001 | Stockholm | Fantastika 2001 | Robin Hobb, Robert Rankin, Karolina Bjällerstedt Mickos, Pierre Christin |
| 5 | 2002 | Linköping | ConFuse 2002 | China Miéville, Gwyneth Jones |
| 6 | 2003 | Uppsala | Upsala SF-möte X | Alastair Reynolds, Ken MacLeod |
| 7 | 2004 | Stockholm | Swecon 2004 | M. John Harrison, Dave Lally, Tim Russ |
| 8 | 2005 | Gothenburg | ConCeive | Charles Stross, Erik Granström |
| 9 | 2006 | Stockholm | Imagicon | Joe Haldeman, Geoff Ryman, Martin Andreasson |
| 10 | 2007 | Gothenburg | Conviction | Richard Morgan, John Ajvide Lindqvist |
| 11 | 2008 | Linköping | ConFuse 2008 | Cory Doctorow, Adam Roberts |
| 12 | 2009 | Stockholm | Imagicon 2 | Liz Williams, Graham Joyce |
| 13 | 2010 | Gothenburg | Condense | Justina Robson, Nene Ormes |
| 14 | 2011 | Stockholm | Eurocon 2011 | Elizabeth Bear, Ian McDonald, John-Henri Holmberg, Jukka Halme |
| 15 | 2012 | Uppsala | Kontrast | Sara Bergmark Elfgren, Mats Strandberg, Joe Abercrombie, Peter Watts, Kelly Link, Niels Dalgaard |
| 16 | 2013 | Stockholm | Fantastika 2013 | Lavie Tidhar, Jo Walton, Johan Anglemark, Karin Tidbeck |
| 17 | 2014 | Gävle | Steampunkfestival i Gävle | Cory Doctorow, Mike Perschon, Miriam Rosenberg Rocek, Chris Wooding |
| 18 | 2015 | Linköping | ConFuse 2015 | Madeline Ashby, Kristina Hård, Ben Aaronovitch |
| 19 | 2016 | Stockholm | Fantastika 2016 | Maria Turtschaninoff, Jerry Määttä, Carolyn Ives Gilman, Caroline Mullan |
| 20 | 2017 | Uppsala | Kontur | Kameron Hurley, Ann Leckie, Siri Pettersen |
| 21 | 2018 | Stockholm | Fantastika 2018 | Ian Watson, Mike Carey, Kij Johnson |
| 22 | 2019 | Västerås | Replicon | Charlie Jane Anders, Annalee Newitz, Gunilla Jonsson, Michael Petersén |
| 23 | 2021 | Stockholm | Fantastika 2021 | Adrian Tchaikovsky, Eva Holmquist, Peadar Ó Guilín, Maria Nilsson |
| 24 | 2022 | Stockholm | Ö-kon 3 | Torill Kornfeldt, Boel Bermann |
| 25 | 2023 | Uppsala | Konflikt | Johan Egerkrans, Merja Polvinen, Francesco Verso, Martha Wells |
| 26 | 2024 | Stockholm | Fantastika 2024 | Juliet E. McKenna, Tendai Huchu, Åsa Schwarz, Lena Karlin |
| 27 | 2025 | Lund | Luncon 2025 | Charles Stross, Hildur Knútsdóttir, Jesper Stage, Jessica Schiefauer |
| 28 | 2026 | Stockholm | Fantastika 2026 | Maura McHugh, Anna Gustafsson Chen, Gareth L. Powell |
| 29 | 2027 | Västerås | Replicon 2027 | |

== See also ==
- List of science fiction conventions
