= List of Engelsfors characters =

The following is a list of the character in The Circle and the Engelsfors trilogy.

== The Chosen Ones ==
=== Minoo Falk Karimi ===
Minoo is a character with a Swedish father and a mother from Iran. Her family moved to Engelsfors, her father's hometown, when she was young, and Minoo has consistently struggled to fit in. Her family is well-off and lives in a large house in the wealthy section of Engelsfors. A studious girl and a teacher's pet, she is shy and a bit of a loner and is very self-conscious about her body. She develops a close friendship with Rebecka; following Rebecka's death, she becomes the de facto leader of the Chosen Ones. She is friends with all of the Chosen Ones, but later becomes closest to Linnéa and Anna-Karin. In The Circle she has a crush on one of her teachers, Max, but in later on in the trilogy she falls in love with Gustaf and loses her virginity to him. Unlike the other Chosen Ones, Minoo has no direct association with any of the elements and instead serving as a direct link to the Guardians. After the final confrontation with the Demons and the Protectors, Minoo loses all her magic abilities since they stemmed from them.

Element: None
Powers and Abilities: Memory manipulation and alteration, ability to "see" the magical aurora of all humans and judge their magical potential/strength, ability to remove demon blessings

=== Rebecka Mohlin ===
Rebecka is a popular girl who secretly suffers from anorexia; despite there being several rumors in school about her eating disorder, Rebecka never received help for it. She is in love with her boyfriend, Gustaf, another popular student. Rebecka has a good home life and has four younger siblings. After her status of being a Chosen One is revealed, she is secretly tasked by Matilda to be the one to help keep the Chosen Ones together and soon becomes good friends with Minoo. Rebecka is killed in The Circle by Max. After her soul is freed from Max's body by Minoo, Rebecka lingers in the Borderlands until the end of The Key, when she helps the other Chosen Ones to close the final portal. She accepts that Minoo and Gustaf are together now and then passes on for good.

Element: Fire
Powers and Abilities: Telekinesis

=== Anna-Karin Nieminen ===
Anna-Karin lives at a farm with her mother and grandfather, who has Finnish ancestry. She has been bullied throughout her whole school life for being overweight and sweating a lot. Her element is earth and her power is that she can control other people into doing what she wants. This power gets overwhelming for her and she use it to make herself the new popular girl in school, along with trying to tear her mother out of the depressed, almost apathetic state she has long since been in. She also use the power to get close to her crush, Jari. All this gets her in trouble with the magic community, something which becomes important in Fire.

Element: Earth
Powers and abilities: Mind control/manipulation, super strength

=== Vanessa Dahl ===
Vanessa is described as conventionally attractive with bleached blonde hair and skin that tans well. A popular girl who loves to party, Vanessa has a wide group of friends, though her best friends outside of the Chosen Ones are Michelle and Evelina. Vanessa has a bit of tumultuous home life and often clashes with her mother's boyfriend, Nicke, a police officer. She has a much younger brother who she loves very much. Vanessa's boyfriend throughout most of the trilogy is an older boy named Wille, who is friends with Jonte, a local drug dealer. Throughout the trilogy, Vanessa becomes close friends with Linnéa, and eventually falls in love with her. The trilogy ends with them in a relationship; Vanessa frequently describes Linnéa as "the love of her life".

Element: Air
Powers and abilities: Invisibility, flight

=== Linnéa Wallin ===
Linnéa has an implied interest in manga, j-pop and goth fashion. Her mother is dead and her father Björn is an alcoholic, leading to her spending years at foster homes and with substitute parents. She has had problems with substance abuse and panic attacks. She now lives in an apartment provided to her by the Swedish social services. She sews a lot of her own clothes and also draw pictures which have at multiple instances been praised by other characters. She and Elias are the only two of the chosen ones who had any kind of relationship before their powers were revealed and their friendship has been described as a "siblings in everything but blood". Thanks to her element of water she can read peoples minds and later also communicate by telepathy.

Element: Water
Powers and abilities: Mind-reading/telepathy, ability to control the temperature of water

=== Ida Holmström ===
Ida is considerably popular, she belongs to one of Engelfors' more successful families and is described as a thin, natural blonde. She is disliked by the other chosen ones, being one of those who bullied Elias and Anna-Karin. She is described as false by Gustaf, and this is reinforced by her keeping secrets to the other witches. She is the first to communicate with the protectors through the book and also makes a deal with it to play along with the group in exchange for her powers to be taken away and a relationship with the love of her life, Gustaf. Her biggest interest outside of popularity is the horse Troja, which she is a caretaker of. Her element is metal, and she serves as the body which Mathilda possess when she communicate with the chosen ones. She is killed trying to protect Gustaf and is trapped in the Borderland. She communicates to the still living Chosen Ones like Matilda and haunts Linnéa's enemies to get them to confess trying to murder her. Ida locates Elias and Rebecka in the Borderland and summon them to the last battle. Afterwards she passes on.

Element: Metal
Powers and abilities: Mediumship, ability to generate/control electricity

=== Elias Malmgren ===
A troubled boy who apparently suffered from paranoia. He was bullied throughout most of his life (mostly by Ida and her friends) and was only protected by Linnéa. The two grew so close that they regarded each other as siblings and only truly trusted one another. They also had a mutual friendship with Olivia, a girl with turquoise hair from an upper-middle-class background. Elias parents ignored his problems for very long, not wanting to risk their position as a leading family in the city. This topic is dealt more thoroughly with in Fire. Elias spent time at a mental hospital as he had been dealing with self-harm and substance abuse, presumably to ease his anxiety. It is hinted at that Elias was bisexual as Linnéa remembers that he admitted being attracted to fictional people like Misa Amane and Edward Scissorhands. Elias dies in the first chapter of The Circle and his death and memory deeply affects the characters and events in both The Circle and Fire. He had the element of wood and could presumably have developed the ability to change his appearance at will if given the chance, the film version makes this quite clear. His soul resides in the Borderlands and is summoned during the final battle. Afterwards he says goodbye to Linnéa and passes on together with Rebecka and Ida.

Element: Wood
Powers and abilities: Shapeshifting

=== Matilda ===
The previous Chosen One who was burned to death 400 years ago during the time of the Swedish Witch Trials. In Fire revealed to have been Nicolaus daughter.

Element: All
Powers and abilities: Unknown

== Engelsfors Residents ==
=== Nicolaus Elingius ===
The school janitor, he is the destined "protector" of the Chosen Ones. However, he suffers from amnesia and only over time does he realize his true purpose in Engelsfors. He has a one-eyed cat familiar named simply Cat. In The Key, his past is revealed: he is a natural wood witch from the 17th century and Matilda's father. Through a large human sacrifice he was able to preserve his life and seal away his memories. It is also eventually revealed that Nicolaus is one third of the "key" needed to close the last portal, which means he must die. Nicolaus does not appear in the film version.

=== Gustaf Åhlander ===
Rebecka's boyfriend in The Circle. Following Rebecka's death, he befriends Minoo and eventually falls in love with her. A star soccer player, he is very popular, with many girls at school having a crush on him; this includes Ida, who has been in love with him for many years. After learning of the existence of magic and The Chosen Ones, he becomes an ally to them, despite having little to no natural magical ability himself.

=== Erik Forslund ===
A popular student from a wealthy family, he is a ruthless and psychopathic school bully. Erik was Ida's boyfriend until their break-up in Fire. Aggressively violent, he attacks Linnéa in Fire in an attempt to kill her; he is later arrested and put on trial in The Key. During the trial, Anna-Karin forces him to confess to his crimes and he ends up getting sent to prison.

=== Mona Månstråle ===
The chain-smoking, moody owner of a magic shop in Engelsfors called "The Crystal Cave", which sells mostly useless artifacts. A natural metal witch herself, Mona has the ability of precognition; she often dispenses vague and sometimes unhelpful advice to the Chosen Ones via her glimpses into the future. She refuses to acknowledge the law of The Council and sees herself as a true neutral player and everything. According to the authors, she is a spoof of Lyria in The Craft. Mona does not appear in the film version.

=== Max Rosenqvist ===
Minoo and Anna-Karin's homeroom teacher. He is obsessed with Minoo (who has a crush on him), as she reminds him of his first murder victim, his ex-girlfriend Alice. In The Circle he is revealed to be the demons' Blessed One and the murderer of both Elias and Rebecka. During a battle with the Chosen Ones, Minoo removes the demons' blessing from Max, which causes him to fall into a coma. He later awakens in The Key, re-blessed by the demons, and tries to kill Minoo. However, in his weakened state, he is not able to withstand the power of the demons and ends up dying.

=== Nicke ===
The boyfriend of Jannike, Vanessa's mother, and the father of Melvin. He has a strong dislike for Wille and Linnéa. He is dumped by Jannike after Vanessa sees him with another woman.

=== Wille ===
Vanessa's boyfriend and Linnéa's ex-boyfriend. A slacker who lives at home with his mother, he is good friends with Jonte, a local drug dealer. He is strongly disliked by Vanessa's mother and Nicke, who view him as an irresponsible trouble-maker. For a short while, he and Vanessa are engaged. In Fire he reveals that he cheated on her with another girl, Elin, and the two break-up because of it. He later gets Elin pregnant.

=== Olivia Henriksson ===
Olivia was good friends with Linnéa and Elias, the latter of whom she was in love with. She dyes her hair blue in order to try and fit in more with Elias and Linnéa. She becomes depressed after Elias' death. In Fire, she is revealed to be the demons' new Blessed One. She is eventually stopped by the Chosen Ones, but Olivia manages to kill Ida in the resulting battle. She is held by The Council for a period of time until she later escapes and attempts to kill the Chosen Ones once more in The Key. She is finally killed by Vanessa during a confrontation at Vanessa's home, after killing Vanessa's beloved dog. She had a relationship with Richard, a friend of Gustaf, but she only did it because she liked the attention and was solely interested in Elias.

=== Helena Malmgren ===
Elias' mother, who is a priest. In Fire she joins Olivia in a crusade to avenge Elias and bring him back. When Helena realises that Elias would not have wanted her to kill people and refuses to harm any more people, Olivia kills her.

=== Jari ===
Anna-Karin's crush. For a time she manipulates him into dating her. In the film, Jari is combined with the character of Kevin.

=== Jonte ===
Wille's friend, Jonte is drug dealer who grows marijuana in his basement. In The Circle he has a brief affair with Linnéa. He also owns an unregistered handgun, which Linnéa steals and attempts to use to kill Max. He later is killed in Fire, having had sold drugs to Elias the night before Elias died.

=== Björn Wallin ===
Linnéa's alcoholic, estranged father. In Fire he joins "Positive Engelsfors" and approaches Linnéa and says he doesn't really deserve her forgiveness but that he wants to change.

=== Rickard ===
Gustaf's friend and Olivia's lover. Unlike Olivia, his feeling in the relationship where honest and he truly loved her. He became the first to fall under her control and figured out the truth about the Chosen Ones on his own and questions Minoo about it during his and Gustaf's graduation party. Minoo finds out he has magic abillites of his own and becomes a confidant with the Chosen Ones.

== The Council ==
The Council is an ancient organization which keeps a watchful eye over magic activity across the world and does its best to control it. The Council was originally created to serve the Chosen One, but has since forgotten its original purpose in favor of controlling magical laws and keeping tabs on all prophecies. In recent times, The Council has dismissed the Chosen One(s) to be nothing but myth.

=== Adriana Lopez ===
A member of The council and the Chosen Ones' mentor. When she was younger, she once attempted to break her vow of loyalty to The Council; her punishment was to have the fire elemental symbol burned into her chest, which prevents her from lying to The Council until oath by causing her severe physical pain. She is trained, rather than natural, fire witch. Being a non-natural witch, she has very weak powers. At the start of The Circle she is the principle of the school attended by the Chosen Ones, however, she is later forced out of the position. For a while, to prevent her execution, she had all of her memories of the Chosen Ones removed by Minoo; Minoo later restored those memories and broke The Council's bond on Adriana.

=== Alexander Ehrenskiöld ===
Adriana's brother. A devoted member of The Council, he is ruthless and power-hungry and is willing to go to extreme lengths to prove his loyalty. He has great disdain for his sister, Adriana, yet he cares for her well being. He has two adopted children, Viktor and Clare, who he saved from an abusive household. Following Walter's treachery and death he becomes the new leader of the council's Swedish division. Having lost his son, Minoo saving his daughter and realised that Walter manipulated him and the Chosen Ones where correct all along he is softer towards the Chosen Ones at the end of The Key.

=== Viktor Ehrenskiöld ===
Introduced in Fire. Alexander's adopted son. A natural water witch, he has the ability to detect when someone is lying. Although loyal to The Council, he did not swear a vow to them; he explains to Minoo that he wishes to change The Council for the better from the inside. He is very devoted to his twin sister, Clare and is secretly in love with Vanessa. Through the books, he forms a friendship with Minoo and saves Linnéa's life when Erik tries to murder her. At the end of The Key he his neck is snapped by Walter and he dies immediately. Walter takes his soul to gain his powers, like Max did with Elias and Rebecka. When Walter's soul has been annihilated by Minoo, his soul is set free and passes on.

=== Clara Ehrenskiöld ===
Alexander's adopted daughter. A natural air witch, she has the ability to turn invisible; as a child, after turning herself invisible, she found herself unable to become visible again. She has spent most of her life being invisible and is thus very loyal to Viktor and Alexander, two of the few people who know she exists. Unknown to the Chosen Ones, she had sometimes followed them and reported their activities to Viktor. She is able to turn visible again with the help of Minoo.

=== Walter Hjorth ===
Walter is the leader of the Swedish division of the Counsel. He sets up an alternative circle to the Chosen Ones. He tries to pass himself off as a reasonable man, but is in secret corrupt and lacks empathy. At the end of The Key, it is revealed that the Demons has tried to corrupt him for a year but he resisted as he thought the Protectors would award him with world domination if he helped stop the Demons. When he realises it was a lie he is blessed by the Demons and kills several members of his circle, including Viktor. However, he is no match for Minoo who annihilates his soul and existence completely.
