= The Circle (2015 film) =

- Theatrical release poster
- Directed by: Levan Akin
- Screenplay by: Sara Bergmark Elfgren; Levan Akin
- Based on: The Circle; 2011 novel by: Sara Bergmark Elfgren; Mats Strandberg
- Produced by: Benny Andersson; Ludvig Andersson; Cecilia Norman Mardell; Hanna Bengtsson
- Starring: Josefin Asplund; Helena Engström; Ruth Vega Fernandez; Irma von Platen; Hanna Asp; Leona Axelsen; Sverrir Gudnason
- Cinematography: Neus Ollé-Soronellas
- Edited by: Gustav Wachtmeister
- Music by: Benny Andersson
- Production company: RMV
- Distributed by: Buena Vista International
- Release dates: 10 February 2015 (Berlin International Film Festival); 18 February 2015
- Running time: 144 minutes
- Country: Sweden
- Language: Swedish
- Budget: SEK 40 million (about US$4.7 million)
- Box office: US$1.1 million

The Circle (original title: Cirkeln) is a Swedish fantasy directed and co-written by Levan Akin, based on the best-selling novel The Circle by Sara Bergmark Elfgren and Mats Strandberg, the former of whom also co-wrote the screenplay. It was produced and scored by ABBA member Benny Andersson. The film was intended to be the first in a trilogy of films based on Engelsfors, though plans of the sequels have been cancelled. A film adaptation was to be produced by Filmlance in 2013, with Levan Akin set to direct and Bergmark Elfgren as script writer. The production was put on hold due to disagreements between the authors and Filmlance. Akin left the project as well. Benny Andersson's son Ludvig brought the novel to his attention and he bought the rights to produce the film, more faithfully than Filmlance intended, however the film still has significant differences from the original novel. Open castings for young girls who could play the leads were held all over Sweden.

The film was screened at the 2015 Berlin International Film Festival, and it was released in Swedish cinemas on 18 February 2015.

== Plot ==
The film follows Rebecka, Minoo, Vanessa, Anna-Karin, Ida and Linnea, all of whom are first-year students at the same secondary school. The apparent suicide of Linnea's best friend Elias becomes the start for a series of strange events in the town, as the 6 girls discover they are witches chosen to save the world.

== Cast ==
- Josefin Asplund as Rebecka
- Helena Engström as Anna-Karin Nieminen
- Miranda Frydman as Vanessa
- Irma von Platen as Minoo
- Ruth Vega Fernandez as Adriana Lopez
- Leona Axelsen as Linnéa
- Sverrir Gudnason as Max
- Hanna Asp as Ida
- Gustav Lindh as Elias
- Charlie Petersson as Willie
- Christopher Wagelin as Nicke
- Ann-Sofie Nurmi as Mia Niemine
- Dick Idman as Taisto Nieminen
- Vincent Grahl as Vincent Grahl
- Sebastian Hiort af Ornäs as Kevin
- Per Svensson as Falk
- Natalie Minnevik as Matilda

== Production ==
The film was shot in Södertälje, Lidingö and Vuollerim.

== Soundtrack ==
The score of the film was produced and composed by Benny Andersson, with his son Ludvig Andersson providing additional music and serving as music supervisor. The film includes music by Anna von Hausswolff, Fever Ray, Daughter, Style of Eye and new music by The Hives. Kate Bush's Running Up That Hill is used prominently in the film and She Will by Savages from the album Silence Yourself is played over the closing credits. Benny Andersson secured the rights to use Running Up That Hill by promising Kate Bush's manager to repay the favour by performing as a pianist if she needed one. Originally Andersson wanted Karin Dreijer Andersson to compose the score.

== Reception ==
After the Berlin Film Festival screening, Screen International wrote about The Circle that it was "emotionally literate" and that the characters had "an unexpected degree of depth". The Hollywood Reporter stated that the script did not develop the characters properly and that it felt like parts of a TV-series where everybody knew everything about the characters and that the actors were not allowed to do much with their characters. It was met with mostly positive reviews from Swedish critics. Due to poor box office, the planned sequels were cancelled and Akin started work on And Then We Danced instead.
