= Josefin Asplund =

Swedish actress (born 1991)

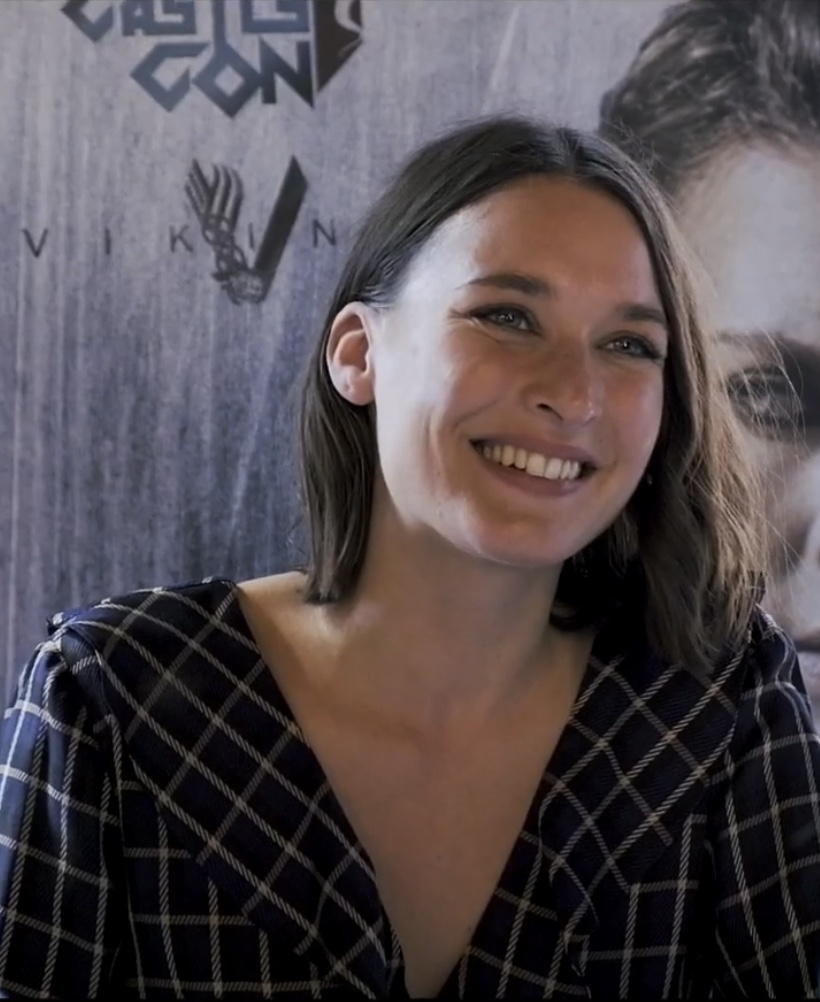
- Josefin Asplund in 2019
- Born: 15 October 1991 (age 34); Stockholm, Sweden
- Occupation: Actress
- Years active: 2011–present

Maria Josefin Asplund (born 15 October 1991) is a Swedish actress. She is known to international audiences for her roles as Astrid on the History Channel series Vikings and Pernilla Blomkvist in The Girl with the Dragon Tattoo (2011). She starred in the 2015 film adaptation of the Swedish novel The Circle.

== Biography ==
Asplund grew up in the suburbs of Stockholm, Sweden, with her Polish mother, Swedish father and older sister. Asplund's parents divorced when she was 7 years old.

Asplund began acting at the local theater close to her home at the age of 6, where she played various characters in different musicals until her teenage years. During her childhood the stage was one of few places that truly felt like home, she said in an interview with Swedish Radio.

Later, Asplund studied acting at Södra Latins Gymnasium (Southern Latin secondary school), graduating in 2010. Shortly after, she was cast in David Fincher's adaptation of The Girl with the Dragon Tattoo opposite Daniel Craig. She played one of the lead roles in the film adaption (2015) of the best selling Swedish novel The Circle and gained international recognition through her role as Astrid in History Channel series Vikings.

== Filmography ==
=== Film ===
Year	Title	Role	Notes
2011	The Girl with the Dragon Tattoo	Pernilla	
2012	Call Girl	Sonja	
2013	Piska en matta	Caroline	Short film
2015	The Circle	Rebecka Mohlin	
2016	Stödgruppen	Felicia	Short film
2019	Woodland Cemetery	photographer	Short film
2021	Champion of the World	Paola	Russian language
2024	Nova & Alice	Nova	

=== Television ===
Year	Title	Role	Notes
2015	Arne Dahl: Efterskalv	Molly	Mini-series
2016–2018	Vikings	Astrid	18 episodes
2017	Seven and Me ("Sept nains et moi")	Blanche White	Animation, 24 episodes
2018	Conspiracy of Silence ("Ingen utan skuld")	Johanna Månsson	8 episodes
2019	Sanctuary ("Himmelsdalen")	Helena	8 episodes
2020–2023	Top Dog	Emily Jansson	14 episodes
2021	Snöänglar	Jenni	6 episodes
2022	The Gambling Scandal ("Spelskandalen")	Therese	Mini-series
2024	Twilight of the Gods	Fenja (voice)	Episode: "The Bride-Price"
2025	The New Force		Netflix
