= Sean Patrick Fannon =

American role-playing game designer and writer

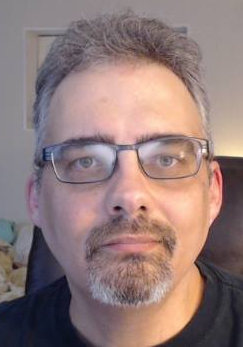
- Born: January 4, 1966 (age 60); Tennessee, United States
- Occupations: Game designer, writer

Sean Patrick Fannon is an American role-playing game designer and writer. He has been working in the gaming industry since 1988, and is best known for his work with the Savage Worlds game system, including his epic fantasy setting, Shaintar, and his conversion of the classic game Rifts. He has also worked as a designer in the video game industry and a consultant in the film industry.

== Early life ==
Fannon was born on January 4, 1966, in Tennessee. He began playing role-playing games in 1977. He worked as a deputy sheriff, airline agent, and armored car driver. He attended West Point from 1984 to 1986.

== Career in role-playing games ==
=== Early works ===
Fannon's career in the gaming industry began in 1988, writing freelance articles and reviews for small-press magazines. He then wrote multiple books for Hero Games' Champions RPG, which led to a job as the Continuity Director of the Champions Universe line. He also wrote books for the Shatterzone RPG and the original Star Wars RPG from West End Games and articles for Shadis Magazine, Adventurer's Club Magazine, and TSR's Dragon Magazine.

In 1995, Fannon wrote The Fantasy Roleplaying Gamer's Bible, an introduction to the role-playing hobby, for Prima Entertainment. A second edition of the book was published by Obsidian Studios in 1999. This book has been cited as a good introductory guide to roleplaying games for people that are not roleplayers.

Multimedia company IEI's games division 8th Wonder Games hired Fannon in 1996 to target the role-playing games niche.

Fannon was one of the staff to join new company FASA as it was being put together in 2012, with his role in marketing and promotion.

=== DriveThruRPG ===
From October 2008 until 2012 Fannon worked as a Marketing and Communications Manager for DriveThruRPG where he managed communications, promotions, marketing, and business development for RPG sites. This included helping to advertise projects like their "Gamers Help Haiti" program, which raised money to donate to Doctors Without Borders during their effort to provide medical support to the people of Haiti following the 2010 Haiti earthquake. This effort raised over $175,000. He also helped DriveThruRPG begin more active support of other charities, leading to them establishing permanent accounts with Hero Initiative, Feeding America, Red Cross, and Doctors Without Borders.

=== Shaintar ===
In 2005, Shaintar: Immortal Legends the first book set in Fannon's epic fantasy setting for Pinnacle Entertainment Group's Savage Worlds RPG, was published by Talisman Studios. In 2013, Savage Mojo began publishing the Shaintar line, starting with a successful Kickstarter campaign for Shaintar: Legends Unleashed. Two Shaintar books, Shaintar: Legends Arise and Shaintar: Legends Unleashed, were nominated for Ennie awards in 2014.

=== Evil Beagle Games ===
In 2012, Fannon started his own game company, Evil Beagle Games, with Carinn Seabolt, in Huntsville, Alabama. From 2014 to 2017, Ross Watson joined the company as Managing Director. In 2017, Evil Beagle Games became an LLC, with Sean, Bill Keyes, Leonard Pimental, and Michael Surbrook forming the company. In 2020 Evil Beagle LLC was restructured and expanded, and Jennifer Shinefeld was appointed CEO.

=== Savage Rifts ===
In 2016, Fannon's Evil Beagle Games partnered with Pinnacle Entertainment Group (PEG) to produce Savage Rifts, which translated Palladium Books' classic Rifts setting to PEG's Savage Worlds rules.

His involvement in Savage Rifts was featured in WIRED Magazine and in a WIRED interview.

=== Video games ===
Fannon worked as a designer for Interplay Productions (on a Star Trek adventure game), Vortex Media Arts (multiple titles, including a Tonka activity game), Infogrames Multimedia, 8th Wonder Games (Drachen Zor), and Telepathy Entertainment (Out There).

== Honors ==
Fannon was the Game Designer Guest of Honor at MomoCon 2013, Gaming Guest of Honor for ConGlomeration in 2014, a featured guest at Cleveland ConCoction, the Gaming Guest of Honor for Con on the Cob in 2016, and 2017, a Celebrity Guest for Tacticon in 2017, a guest at Magic City Con, and a special guest at GenghisCon 2018, and at ChupacabraCon 2017.

Fannon was also part of an academic panel discussion at the 2018 Denver Comic Con with Professor James Fielder, Ph.D. of United States Air Force Academy about Social Sciences in Worlds that Never Were: Using Fantasy and Science Fiction Literature in the Classroom.

== Personal life ==
He currently lives in Littleton, Colorado.

== Bibliography ==
=== Savage Worlds role-playing books ===
- Savage Worlds
  - Freedom Squadron
    - Freedom Squadron Commando's Manual
    - Freedom Squadron Plans & Operations Manual
  - Accursed
    - Accursed: The Guns of Dagerov
    - Accursed: Ill Omens
  - Savage Rifts
    - Savage Rifts: The Tomorrow Legion Player's Guide
    - Savage Rifts: Game Master's Handbook (Nominated for a 2017 ENnie award for Best Rules.)
    - Savage Rifts: Savage Foes of North America
    - Savage Rifts: Coalition Field Manual
    - Savage Rifts: Archetypes Set 1
    - Savage Rifts: Archetypes Set 2
    - A Fine Solution 1: Welcome to the World
    - A Fine Solution 2: The Circle of Death
    - A Fine Solution 3: Triangle Triad
    - A Fine Solution 4: Unwanted Heroes
    - A Fine Solution 5: Power Play
  - Shaintar
    - Shaintar: Legends Arise (Nominated for a 2014 ENnie award.)
    - Shaintar: Legends Unleashed (Nominated for a 2014 ENnie award.)
    - Shaintar Immortal Legends
    - Shaintar Atlas
    - Shaintar Black Lantern Report: Camden
    - Shaintar Black Lantern Report: Mercenary Companies
    - Shaintar Black Lantern Report: Origins of the Society
    - Shaintar: Dwarven Clanhomes
    - Shaintar Adventure: The Burning Heart
    - Shaintar Guidebook: Desert Princes
    - Shaintar Guidebook: Dregordia
    - Shaintar Guidebook: Eastport
    - Shaintar Guidebook: Elvish Nation
    - Shaintar Guidebook: The Freelands
    - Shaintar Guidebook: Galea
    - Shaintar Guidebook: Goblinesh
    - Shaintar Guidebook: Korindia
    - Shaintar Guidebook: Magic & Cosmology (Vol I)
    - Shaintar Guidebook: Malakar Dominion
    - Shaintar Guidebook: Mindoth's Tower
    - Shaintar Guidebook: Nazatir
    - Shaintar Guidebook: Olara
    - Shaintar Guidebook: Prelacy of Camon
    - Shaintar Guidebook: Serenity
    - Shaintar Guidebook: Shaya'Nor
    - Shaintar Guidebook: The Wildlands
    - Shaintar Anthology: Southern Kingdoms
    - Bloody Awful
    - Godstrike Tempest: Shaintar/Suzerain Crossover
    - Flame Down Below
  - Other Savage Worlds works
    - Crossbows, Crafting, and Ka-ZOT!
    - Day in the Life: Gaming the Downtime
    - Dungeonlands: Heroes And Servitors
    - Enascentia: Touch of Flame
    - Nova Praxis: Savage Worlds edition
    - Fire in the Darkness
    - Savagely Useful: Random Magic Items

=== Other role-playing games ===
- Aaron Allston's Strike Force (revised) (Winner of a 2016 BAMFsie award.)
- Shatterzone: Arsenal
- Shatterzone: GearTech
- Champions: Champions Universe, 4th edition
- Dark Heresy: Creatures Anathema (Winner of a 2009 ENnie award.)
- Edge of the Empire: Suns of Fortune
- Shards of the Stone: Core
- Hero 4th edition: High Tech Enemies
- Hero 4th edition: The Mutant File
- Series Pitch of the Month: No Crowns
- Cracken's Rebel Operatives (West End's Star Wars RPG)
- Star Wars: Age of Rebellion
- Star Wars: Edge of the Empire

=== Other works ===
- A Better Game With Dice and Chips 2010
- Bring Dice & Chips: The Holiday Collection 2011
- The Fantasy Roleplaying Gamer's Bible
- The Fantasy Roleplaying Gamer's Bible, 2nd edition
- So Yer Wantin' t' Talk Like a Pirate!
