= High Tech Enemies =

Role-playing game supplement

Cover art by Storn Cook

High Tech Enemies is a supplement published by Hero Games/I.C.E. in 1992 for the 4th edition of the superhero role-playing game Champions.

== Contents ==
High Tech Enemies is a sourcebook featuring thiry-nine supervillains that use high levels of technology to supplement their skills.

== Publication history ==
In 1981, Hero Games published the superhero role-playing game (RPG) Champions. By 1996, Hero Games was in financial difficulty, and was eventually taken over as a subsidiary of Iron Crown Enterprises (I.C.E.). In 1989, Hero Games/I.C.E. published a fourth edition of Champions. Two years later, Hero Games/I.C.E. released High Tech Enemies, a 96-page softcover book by Sean Patrick Fannon, with interior illustrations by Greg Smith and cover art by Storn Cook.

== Reception ==
Sean Holland reviewed High Tech Enemies in White Wolf #36 (1993), rating it a 4 out of 5 and stated that "Overall, I think High Tech Enemies is one of the best Enemies books to come out and I highly recommend it to all Champions Game Masters. GMs of other superhero games should also give it a look since it contains many good ideas."

In the September 1993 edition of Dragon (Issue #197), Allen Varney was not a fan of this book, questioning the utility of yet another volume of Champions supervillains. He also found the content lacked creativity, commenting, "'My,' you say, 'how can this seemingly arbitrary and sterile premise give rise to a gallery of unique new foes, unlike any seen before?' We don’t find out. The villains in High Tech Enemies serve no new campaign function, and they conjure few novel ideas."
