= The Fantasy Roleplaying Gamer's Bible =

Tabletop role-playing game supplement

- Cover art for 1998 edition
- Author: Sean Patrick Fannon
- Publisher: Obsidian Studios, Palladium Books
- Publication date: 1996
- Pages: 320
- ISBN: 0761502645

The Fantasy Roleplaying Gamer's Bible is a book detailing fantasy role-playing games (RPGs), written by Sean Patrick Fannon and published by Prima Publishing in 1996. The book was distributed only to chain bookstores rather than hobby shops. In 1998, Palladium Books published an updated second edition that reorganized content and included an updated history of the genre.

== Contents ==
In the 258-page The Fantasy Roleplaying Gamer's Bible, Sean Patrick Fannon first gives an explanation of role-playing, and then a history of role-playing from its roots up to the time the book was written. Fannon then lists many of the role-playing products published, as well as opinions about each game — his as well as those of other game critics.

== Reception ==
In the June 1996 edition of Dragon (Issue #230), John Bunnell stated that the book was "a wide-ranging and thoroughly cogent volume that provides more information and advice on gaming than any other single reference book published on the subject to date". Bunnell liked Fannon's approach of writing the book for non-gamers, noting the inclusion of "extensive glossary supplements... The book is also liberally peppered with mini-essays." Bunnell also liked Fannon's writing style, "deliberately amusing and self-referential, with a good deal of the humor at his own expense". Bunnell did criticize Fannon's history of gaming, saying that Fannon's narrative focus after the birth of Dungeons & Dragons "narrows too much; he concentrates on game companies and design trends while giving only sparse attention to evolution on the players' side of the cash register." Despite this Bunnel concluded that "There's room left on the reference shelf for more detailed books on specific aspects of gaming, but as a general survey of the field, this volume can't be matched."

In a review in the May/June 1996 issue of Pyramid (issue 19), Jeff Koke states that the structure and casual tone of the book are helpful to newcomers to role-playing games. In particular, he cites the content about how to organize gaming groups, schedule gaming sessions, find game masters and players, where to obtain gaming books and accessories, and where to play as informative for new players. He also stated that the discussion about means to dismiss "allegations of demon worship and black magic" was a sensible inclusion.

== Reviews ==
- Games Unplugged #1 (June/July, 2000)
