= WillyCon =

- Location: Wayne, Nebraska
- Country: United States
- Organizer: Science Fiction and Fantasy Club of Wayne State College
- Website: www.wsc.edu/willycon

WillyCon was a regional science fiction and fantasy convention founded in 1999 and held annually until 2019. It was a general interest convention promoting science fiction, fantasy, and fandom in general. The convention was run by the Science Fiction and Fantasy Club of Wayne State College (WSC). It was the longest running fan-run convention of this type in northeast Nebraska.

WillyCon was distinguished from many other conventions by its short-story contest. In addition to traditional con activities, WillyCon and its parent organization (the SF & F Club of Wayne State College) has a short-story & poetry contest inviting speculative fiction to be submitted and winners are published in an online E-Zine of Science Fiction, Fantasy, and Horror.

== See also ==
- List of science fiction conventions
