= Gaylaxicon =

LGBT-focused science fiction convention

Logo of the 2009 Gaylaxicon in Minnesota

Gaylaxicon is a recurring science fiction, fantasy and horror convention that focused on gay, lesbian, bisexual and transgender topics. It has taken in various locations in the United States and occasionally Canada, often on the East Coast.

Started in 1988 in Provincetown, Massachusetts, Gaylaxicon was organized by member organizations of the Gaylactic Network. The Gaylaxian Science Fiction Society (GSFS) was the New England–based chapter of the Network, which organized the original convention.

The Gaylactic Spectrum Awards were sometimes awarded at Gaylaxicon and were instituted by the organisers of the conference. They are now managed by the Gaylactic Spectrum Awards Council, an independent organization.

== Origins ==
Gaylaxicon was organized by member organizations of the Gaylactic Network. The Gaylaxian Science Fiction Society (GSFS) is the New England–based chapter of the Network, which organized the original convention in Provincetown, Massachusetts, in 1988.

== Spectrum awards ==
The Gaylactic Spectrum Awards are given to works of science fiction, fantasy and horror that explore LGBTQ (lesbian, gay, bisexual, transgender) topics in a positive way. Established in 1998, the awards were initially presented by the Gaylactic Network, with awards first awarded in 1999 at Gaylaxicon. In 2002 the awards were given their own organization, the Gaylactic Spectrum Awards Foundation.

The results were generally announced and presented at Gaylaxicon, although they have also been presented at Worldcon in the past.

== Conventions ==
This is a list of Gaylaxicon conventions that have been held or scheduled to date:

Year	Location: Town	Location: State	Guest(s) of Honor: Author	Guest(s) of Honor: Other	Note	Refs.
1988	Provincetown	Massachusetts	J.F. Rivkin	—	Gaylaxicon '88, 90 attendees	
1990	Tewksbury	Massachusetts	Melissa Scott	Hannah M.G. Shapero (artist)	Gaylaxicon '90, 130 attendees	
1991	Tewksbury	Massachusetts	Samuel R. Delany	Hannah M.G. Shapero (artist)	Gaylaxicon '91, 245 attendees	
1992	Philadelphia	Pennsylvania	Tanya Huff	Tristan Alexander (artist)	Gaylaxicon IV, 360 attendees	
1994	Rockville	Maryland	Jewelle Gomez	Tom Howell (artist); Forrest J Ackerman (special guest)	Gaylaxicon V, 350 attendees	
1995	Niagara Falls	New York	Don Sakers	Heather Bruton (artist)	Gaylaxicon VI, 180 attendees	
1996	Burlington	Massachusetts	Ellen Kushner; Delia Sherman	Colleen Doran (artist)	Gaylaxicon VII, 342 attendees	
1997	Marlboro	Massachusetts	—	—	Gaylaxicon Lite '97, 90 attendees	
1998	Troy	Michigan	Anne Harris	Kurt Erichson (cartoonist); Frank Gembeck, Jr. (artist)	Gaylaxicon 8, 60 attendees	
1999	Arlington	Virginia	Diane Duane	Nancy Janda (artist); Jean-Pierre Dorleac (special guest)	Gaylaxicon 1999, 303 attendees, the 10th Gaylaxicon	
2000	Arlington	Virginia	Fiona Patton	Nan Fredman (artist)	Gaylaxicon 2000, 265 attendees	
2004	San Diego	California	David Gerrold	Joe Phillips (artist); Virginia Hey (actor, Farscape)	285 attendees	
2005	Boston	Massachusetts	Lois McMaster Bujold	Phil Jimenez (artist: Star Trek: Hidden Frontier)	250 attendees	
2006	Toronto	Ontario (Canada)	Nalo Hopkinson	Ellen Muth (actor); Richard Arnold (media); Michael Rowe (editor)	Gaylaxicon 2006	
2007	Atlanta	Georgia	Jim Grimsley	Georges Jeanty (artist)	Other guests: David Gerrold, Joe Haldeman, Steve Berman, Toni Weisskopf, James Cawley, David B. Coe	
2008	Bethesda	Maryland	Geoff Ryman	Alicia Austin (artist)		
2009	Minneapolis	Minnesota	Margaret Weis	Andy Mangels; Lawrence Schimel; Terrance Griep	Gaylaxicon 2009, 313 attendees	
2010	Montreal	Quebec (Canada)			Canceled	
2011	Atlanta	Georgia	n/a (Wayback of Outlacon website lists guests, but only three GoHs)	Amber Benson (GoH); Don Schermerhorn and Wayne Hergenroder (fan GoHs)	May 13 to 15. Hosted as part of Outlantacon.	
2012	Minneapolis	Minnesota	Kyell Gold	Gary Russell (Writer/Producer); Lyda Morehouse (Writer); Barbara Schulz (Artist)	Gaylaxicon 2012, unknown attendees	
2014	Atlanta	Georgia	Philip Bonneau		May 2–4	
2016	Minneapolis	Minnesota			unknown	
2018	Atlanta	Georgia			May 11–13; Outlantacon/Gaylaxicon 2018 attendance unknown	
2025	Minneapolis	Minnesota	Nghi Vo	Greg Ketter Jim Johnson	October 3-5 at Crowne Plaza Suites: MSP / MOA	

== See also ==
- LGBT themes in speculative fiction—including science fiction
- LGBT themes in comics
- List of science fiction conventions
- Lambda Literary Awards winners and nominees for science fiction, fantasy and horror
