= Fire (Elfgren and Strandberg novel) =

2012 novel

- First edition (Swedish)
- Author: Mats Strandberg and Sara Bergmark Elfgren
- Original title: Eld
- Language: Swedish
- Series: Engelsfors
- Genre: Young adult fiction, Urban fantasy, Horror
- Publisher: Rabén & Sjögren (Swedish), Random House (English)
- Publication date: 2012
- Publication place: Sweden
- English publication date: 2014
- Media type: Print (Paperback and hardback)
- Pages: 704
- ISBN: 978-1-4683-0672-9 (1st edition, English hardcover)
- LC Class: PZ7.E386 Fir 2014
- Preceded by: The Circle
- Followed by: The Key

Fire (Swedish: Eld) is the second part of the Engelsfors trilogy by Mats Strandberg and Sara Bergmark Elfgren and the sequel to Cirkeln. It takes place about 10 weeks after the events of the first novel. It follows the same fantasy like the first and further develops themes of horror fiction, psychological realism and an unreliable narrator(s). The plot also makes analogies to the effects of global warming on Sweden's subarctic climate and the group behaviour dynamics of political, religious and ideological extremist groups.

== Plot ==
There has been 10 weeks since the Chosen ones defeated the emissary of the demons. But everything is far from good. The Chosen ones have problems coming both from the normal world and the magical one. Linnéa still grieves Elias and the families of Minoo and Vanessa are falling apart. The mysterious council are all but friendly towards them and the signs of the apocalypse is appearing; the woods are dying, heat waves plague the town and the Chosen ones have more enemies than ever. The dead will return to the living, secrets will be brought to light, hearts will be broken and a fire will rise.
