= Con†Stellation =

Coordinates: 34°44′6″N 86°37′28″W

- Con†Stellation XXIX: Leo (2010) logo
- Status: Defunct
- Genre: Science fiction/Fantasy
- Venue: Holiday Inn Express, Huntsville
- Locations: Huntsville, Alabama
- Country: United States
- Inaugurated: 1982
- Organizer: North Alabama Science Fiction Association
- Website: con-stellation.org

Con†Stellation (also written as Con*Stellation) was an annual general-interest science fiction convention held in Huntsville, Alabama. Held annually since 1982, Con†Stellation is hosted by the North Alabama Science Fiction Association. The convention was not held in 2014 but the sequence resumed with Con†Stellation XXXIII: Coma Berenices in October 2015.

== Con†Stellation history ==
NASFA was founded in Huntsville circa 1980 partly as a result of local fans meeting at a one-time convention named MidSouthCon, held in Huntsville that year. (This convention is not directly related to the annual convention of the same name in Memphis, Tennessee.) Club members quickly came up with the idea of starting their own science fiction convention. The first of these was a mini one-day con named ZerCon, in November 1981. While planning and executing ZerCon, the club came up with the name "Con*Stellation" (or "Con†Stellation") for a planned ongoing series of longer (three-day) conventions.

The first Con†Stellation was held July 16–18, 1982, under the full name Con†Stellation I: The Pleiades. The time of year varied over the first few conventions, though at least one has been held each year since, except for 2014. In 1983-1984, the convention made the shift from a spring/summer convention to a fall convention. To aid the transition, a two-day mini-convention was held in December 1983, thus avoiding an extremely long gap between Con†Stellation II and Con†Stellation III. Because the convention had already started using Roman numerals for numbering the series, the mini-convention was numbered as Con†Stellation II.V, a deliberate, tongue-in-cheek, mix of Roman numerals and place notation from Arabic numerals. Con†Stellation III was held October 19–21, 1984, at the Sheraton Inn. (GoH: Gordon R. Dickson, AGoH: Mark Maxwell, MC: Frank Kelly Freas, FGoH: Maurine Dorris, "Uncle Timmy")

Each Con†Stellation has been subtitled with an astronomical constellation—usually one of the 88 official modern constellations, though the first one was named after a group of stars in Taurus. The convention often uses the constellation as a theme in its advertising and for events at the convention.

Con†Stellation has been held at a number of Huntsville-area hotels over its history. Other than Con†Stellation II.V, each has been a 3-day (Friday to Sunday) event.

== Past conventions ==
Conventions in the Con†Stellation series have also included Con†Stellation VI: Lyra held October 9–11, 1987; Con†Stellation VII: Centaurus held October 21–23, 1988; Con†Stellation VIII: Cetus held October 13–15, 1989; Con†Stellation IX: Sagittarius held October 19–21, 1990; Con†Stellation X: Draco held November 8–10, 1991; Con†Stellation XI: Scorpio held November 6–8, 1992; Con†Stellation XII: Orion held November 12–14, 1993; Con†Stellation XIII: Musca held November 4–6, 1994; Con†Stellation XIV: Monoceros held November 3–5, 1995; Con†Stellation XV: Aquila held November 8–10, 1996; Con†Stellation XVI: Eridanus held October 17–19, 1997; Con†Stellation XVII: Hydra held October 9–11, 1998; Con†Stellation XVIII: Lupus held October 29–31, 1999; Con†Stellation XIX: Virgo held October 13–15, 2000; Con†Stellation XX: Camelopardalis October 19–21, 2001; Con†Stellation XXI: Pavo held October 18–20, 2002; Con†Stellation XXII: Pegasus October 10–12, 2003; Con†Stellation XXIII: Delphinus held October 15–17, 2004; Con†Stellation XXIV: Lepus held October 7–9, 2005; and Con†Stellation XXV: Cygnus held October 20–22, 2006.

=== Con†Stellation XXVI: Ophiuchus ===
The 26th convention in the series was Con†Stellation XXVI: Ophiuchus, which was held October 12–14, 2007, at the Huntsville, Alabama, Holiday Inn Express. The Guest of Honor was author Mike Shepherd Moscoe. The Fan Guest of Honor was Pat McAdams . The Master of Ceremonies was Dr. Travis S. Taylor. Julie Cochrane, Hugo-nominated editor Lou Anders, and William Drinkard also attended.

=== Con†Stellation XXVII: Cassiopeia ===
The 27th convention in the series was Con†Stellation XXVII: Cassiopeia, held October 17–19, 2008, in Huntsville, Alabama. The Guest of Honor was Diane Duane. The Artist Guest of Honor was Bill Holbrook. The Master of Ceremonies was Mike Resnick. Other guests included Peter Morwood and Laura Resnick; plus Lou Anders, Julie Cochrane, William Drinkard, Allan Gilbreath, Les Johnson, Stephanie Osborn, Bill Snodgrass, and Dr. Travis S. "Doc" Taylor; with a musical appearance by Jeff Ugly Shoes & the Cemetery Surfers.

=== Con†Stellation XXVIII: Vulpecula ===
The 28th convention in the series was Con†Stellation XXVIII: Vulpecula, held September 18–20, 2009, at the Holiday Inn Express located near the intersection of University Drive and Jordan Lane in Huntsville, Alabama. The Guest of Honor was David Weber. The Artist Guest of Honor was John Picacio. The Fan Guest of Honor was Gary Shelton. The Master of Ceremonies was Jack McDevitt. Lou Anders, David Drake, William Drinkard, Eric Flint, Sarah Hoyt, Dr. Travis S. Taylor and Baen publisher Toni Weisskopf also attended.

=== Con†Stellation XXIX: Leo ===
The 29th convention in the series was Con†Stellation XXIX: Leo, held September 17–19, 2010, at the Holiday Inn Express located near the intersection of University Drive and Jordan Lane in Huntsville, Alabama. The Guest of Honor was Wen Spencer. The Artist Guest of Honor was Vincent Di Fate. The Master of Ceremonies was Steve Jackson. The Fan Guest of Honor was Warren Buff. Other guests included Lou Anders, Chris Berman, Mark Fitzgerald, Allan Gilbreath, Les Johnson, Darrel Osborn, Stephanie Osborn, Kimberly Richardson, and Steve White; with a musical appearance by Jeff Ugly Shoes & the Cemetery Surfers.

=== Con†Stellation XXX: Corona Borealis ===
The 30th convention in the series was Con†Stellation XXX: Corona Borealis, held September 16–18, 2011, at the Holiday Inn Express located near the intersection of University Drive and Jordan Lane in Huntsville, Alabama. The Guest of Honor was Gene Wolfe. The Artist Guest of Honor was Lubov. The Master of Ceremonies was Stephanie Osborn. The Fan Guest of Honor was Gay Haldeman. Special Guest was Joe Haldeman. Other notable guests included Chris Berman, David Drake, Allan Gilbreath, Les Johnson, Darrell Osborn, Kimberly Richardson, Toni Weisskopf, and Karen Zimmerman. Russian board games were featured in the gaming track.

=== Con†Stellation XXXI: Perseus ===
The 31st convention in the series was Con†Stellation XXXI: Perseus, held October 12–14, 2012, at the Holiday Inn Express located near the intersection of University Drive and Jordan Lane in Huntsville, Alabama. The Guest of Honor was David B. Coe. The Artist Guest of Honor was Melissa Gay. The Fan Guests of Honor were "The Moon Princesses" (Julie Wall, Toni Weisskopf, and Linda Zielke). The Mistress of Ceremonies was Stephanie Osborn. Other guests included D.B. Jackson, Joe Dickerson, Marc Gunn, Rachael Hill, Les Johnson, and J.F. Lewis.

=== Con†Stellation XXXII: Columba ===
The 32nd convention in the series was Con†Stellation XXXII: Columba, held October 11–13, 2013, at the Holiday Inn Express located near the intersection of University Drive and Jordan Lane in Huntsville, Alabama. The Guest of Honor was Larry Correia. The Artist Guest of Honor was Kurt Miller. The Fan Guest of Honor was Darrell Osborn. The Mistress of Ceremonies was Stephanie Osborn. Other guests included Toni Weisskopf, Les Johnson, L.R. Barrett-Durham, Melissa Gay, and E.G. Glover.

=== Con†Stellation XXXIII: Coma Berenices ===
After the 2014 convention was cancelled and the Holiday Inn Express demolished, the 33rd convention in the series, Con†Stellation XXXIII: Coma Berenices, was held October 16–18, 2015, at the Four Points by Sheraton at Huntsville International Airport. The Guest of Honor was Orson Scott Card. The Artist Guest of Honor was Sam Flegal. The Master of Ceremonies was Jeff "Ugly Shoes" Harris. Other scheduled guests included Julie Cochrane, Louise Herring-Jones, Les Johnson, Bryan Jones, D. Alan Lewis, Jamie Marchant, Dan Thompson, Toni Weisskopf, and Wes Yahola.

== See also ==
- Science fiction fandom
- List of science fiction conventions
