= The Key (Elfgren and Strandberg novel) =

2013 novel by Sara Bergmark Elfgren and Mats Strandberg

- First edition (Swedish)
- Author: Mats Strandberg and Sara Bergmark Elfgren
- Original title: Nyckeln
- Language: Swedish
- Series: The Engelsfors Trilogy
- Genre: Young adult fiction, Urban fantasy, Horror
- Publisher: Rabén & Sjögren (Swedish), Random House (English)
- Publication date: 30 October 2013
- Publication place: Sweden
- Media type: Print (Paperback and hardback)
- ISBN: 978-1468306736 (hardcover)
- LC Class: PZ7.E386 Ke
- Preceded by: Fire

The Key (Swedish title Nyckeln) is the third and final part of Engelsfors, the young adult fantasy novel trilogy.

== Plot ==
After the battle in the gymnasium hall, the Chosen Ones are not sure how to handle the death of Ida. Unbeknownst to them, Ida is trapped with Matilda in the Borderland between life and death. After Viktor begged Minoo to save his sister Clara, the leader of the council's Swedish division, Walter, has realised Minoo's potential as a valuable pawn. The Chosen Ones that are still alive have no chance to recover, and no choice but to rally together to try to prevent the apocalypse — even while their personal dramas threaten to tear them apart.
