= ConCoction =

Fan convention in Cleveland, Ohio, US

- Status: Active
- Genre: Fantasy, Science fiction, Gaming
- Locations: Cleveland, Ohio
- Country: United States
- Inaugurated: 2014
- Website: http://www.clevelandconcoction.org/

ConCoction is a full-spectrum multi-genre fantasy and science fiction convention based in Cleveland, Ohio, and is held annually in March. It is a not-for-profit endeavor run by the local and regional community of fans to promote Community Service, Education, and the Arts in Northeastern, Ohio.

ConCoction as a convention offers several tracks of programming in the arts, costuming, music/filk, literary, media, and the sciences. The convention also includes such events as an art show, a masquerade, an exhibit hall, a gaming hall, and at least one dance. ConCoction also has a children's track of programming that has included open gaming, make and take crafts and the attack of Godzilla as well as costuming, and science programs.

In 2016 this group celebrated the theme of "Space", commemorating the 50th anniversary of TriCon, the 24th World Science Fiction Convention held in Cleveland, Ohio on 1–5 September 1966 at the Sheraton-Cleveland and the pilot premier of Star Trek.

== History ==
=== ConCoction 2017 (4) ===
March 10–12, 2017 2017 Convention Guests:

- Author Guest - Glen Cook
- Media Guest - Jim O'Rear
- Cosplay - Mogchelle Cosplay
- Cosplay - KayceSuper
- Cosplay - Katie Starr
- Music - The Blibbering Humdingers
- Gaming - Lee Garvin
- ConSuite - Cassandra Fear

=== ConCoction 2016 (3) ===
March 11–13, 2016

- John Morton – Actor
- Five Year Mission – Music Guest
- Michael Longcor - Music Guest
- Eddy Webb – Gaming Guest
- Christopher L. Bennett – Author Guest
- Santiago Cirilo - Actor/Director
- Mogchelle - Cosplay Guest
- Alexa Heart - Cosplay Guest

Theme: "Space & Puppets (in honor of the Star Trek 50th Anniversary and debut at TriCon 1966 in Cleveland, Ohio)"

=== ConCoction 2015 (2) ===
March 13–15, 2015 - Approximately 625 attendees

- Tasia Valenza – Actress & Voiceover Actress
- This Way to the Egress – Music Guest
- M. Alice LeGrow – Artist Guest
- Andy Looney – Gaming Guest
- S. Andrew Swann – Author Guest
- Knightmage - Cosplay Guest
- Mogchelle - Cosplay Guest
- Princess Nightmare - Cosplay Guest

Theme: "Steampunk in Wonderland"

=== ConCoction 2014 (1) ===
May 30 - June 1, 2014 - approximately 475 attendees

- Rod Roddenberry – Media Guest of Honor
- Santiago Cirilo – Media Guest
- Heather Kreiter – Artist Guest
- Sean Patrick Fannon – Gaming Guest
- Mandala/Witherwings – Filk Guest
- Wax Chaotic – Filk Guest
- Tonks and the Aurors – Filk Guest
- 2d6 Music – Music Guest

Theme: "Bring Your Genre!"
