= Icecon =

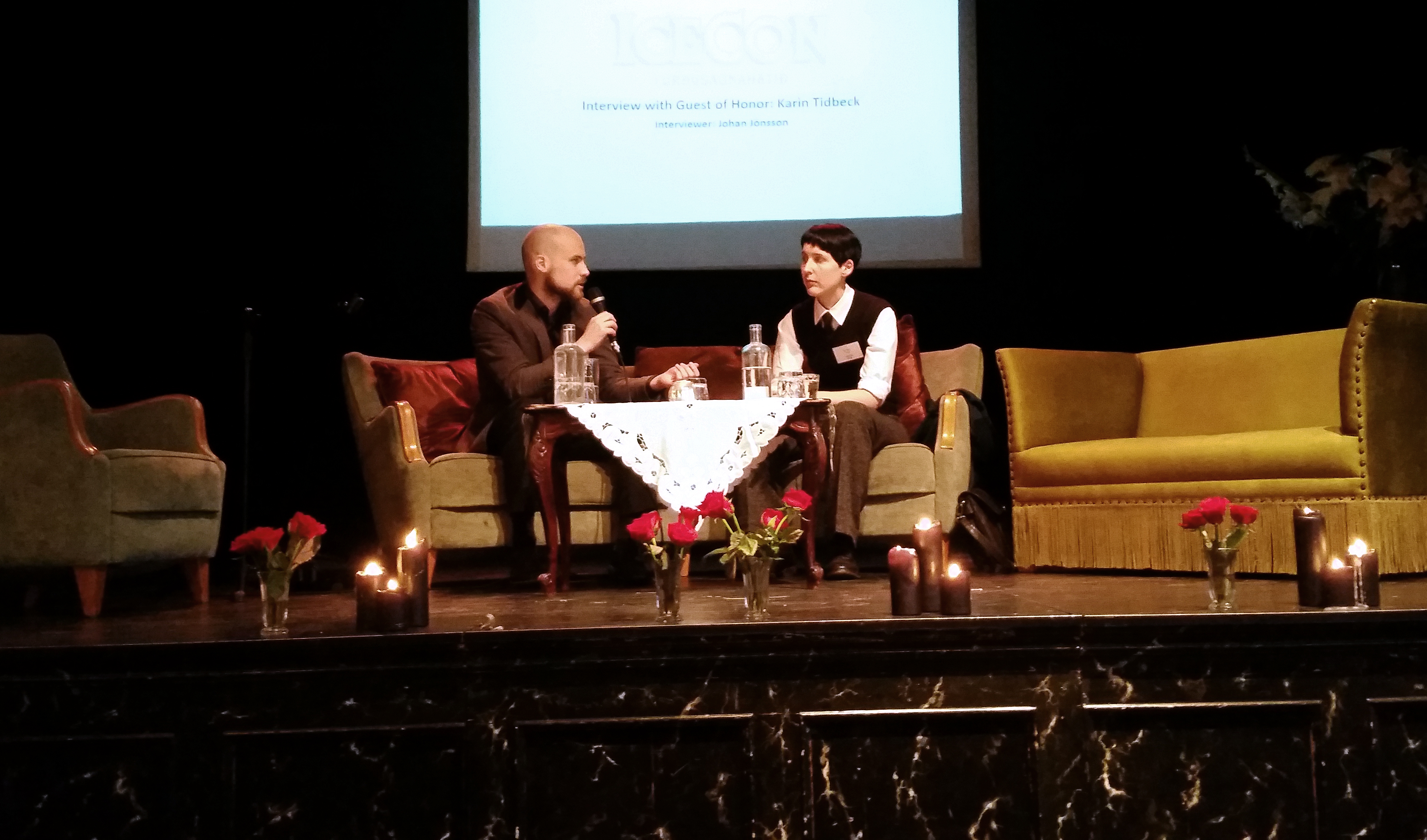
The stage at the first Icecon in 2016: Guest of Honour interview with Karin Tidbeck.

Icecon is a science fiction, fantasy, horror and comic fan convention in Reykjavík, Iceland. The first Icecon was held in 2016. Icecon is a biannual con for both Icelandic and international science fiction and fantasy fandom, and is the only literary Icelandic science fiction and fantasy convention.

== List of Icecons ==
	Year	Dates	Location	Guest(s) of Honour
1	2016	28–30 October	Iðno	Elizabeth Bear, Karin Tidbeck
2	2018	5–7 October	Iðno	Naomi Novik, Úlfhildur Dagsdóttir
3	2021	5–7 November		Mary Robinette Kowal, Hildur Knútsdóttir
4	2024	24–26 May		John Scalzi, Emil Hjörvar Petersen, Kirsty Logan

== Gallery ==
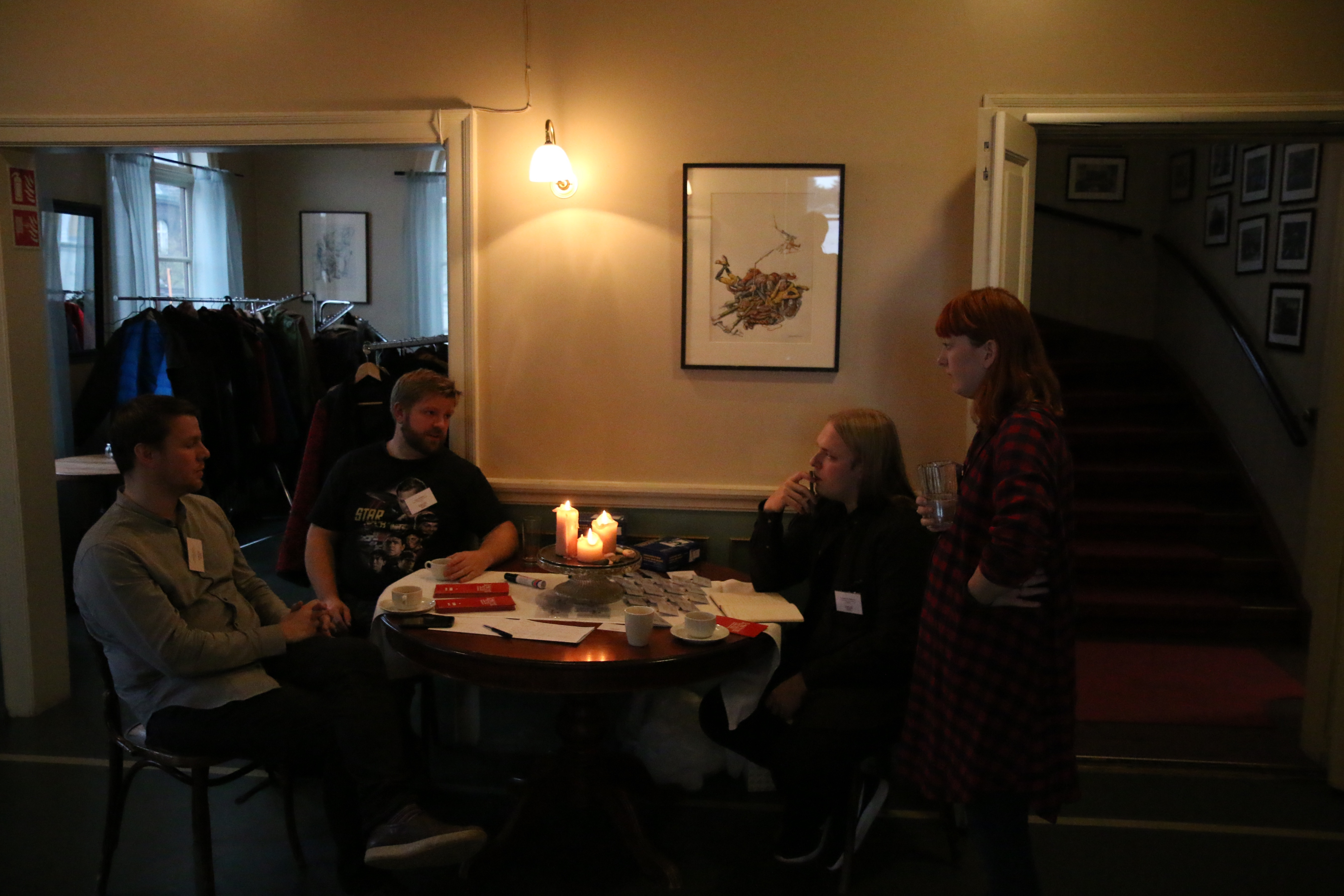
Parts of the committee in conversation, 2016.

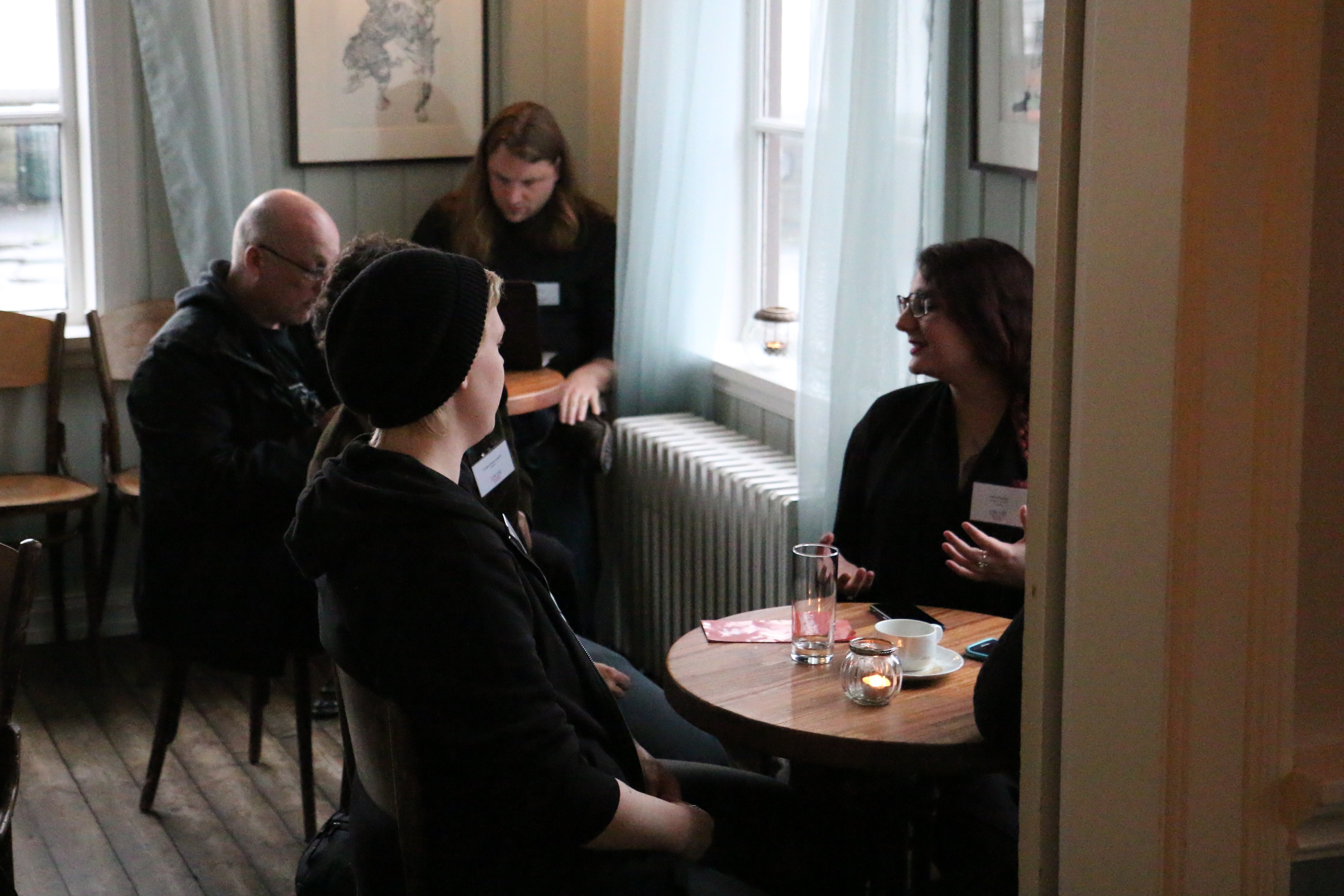
Social area, 2016.

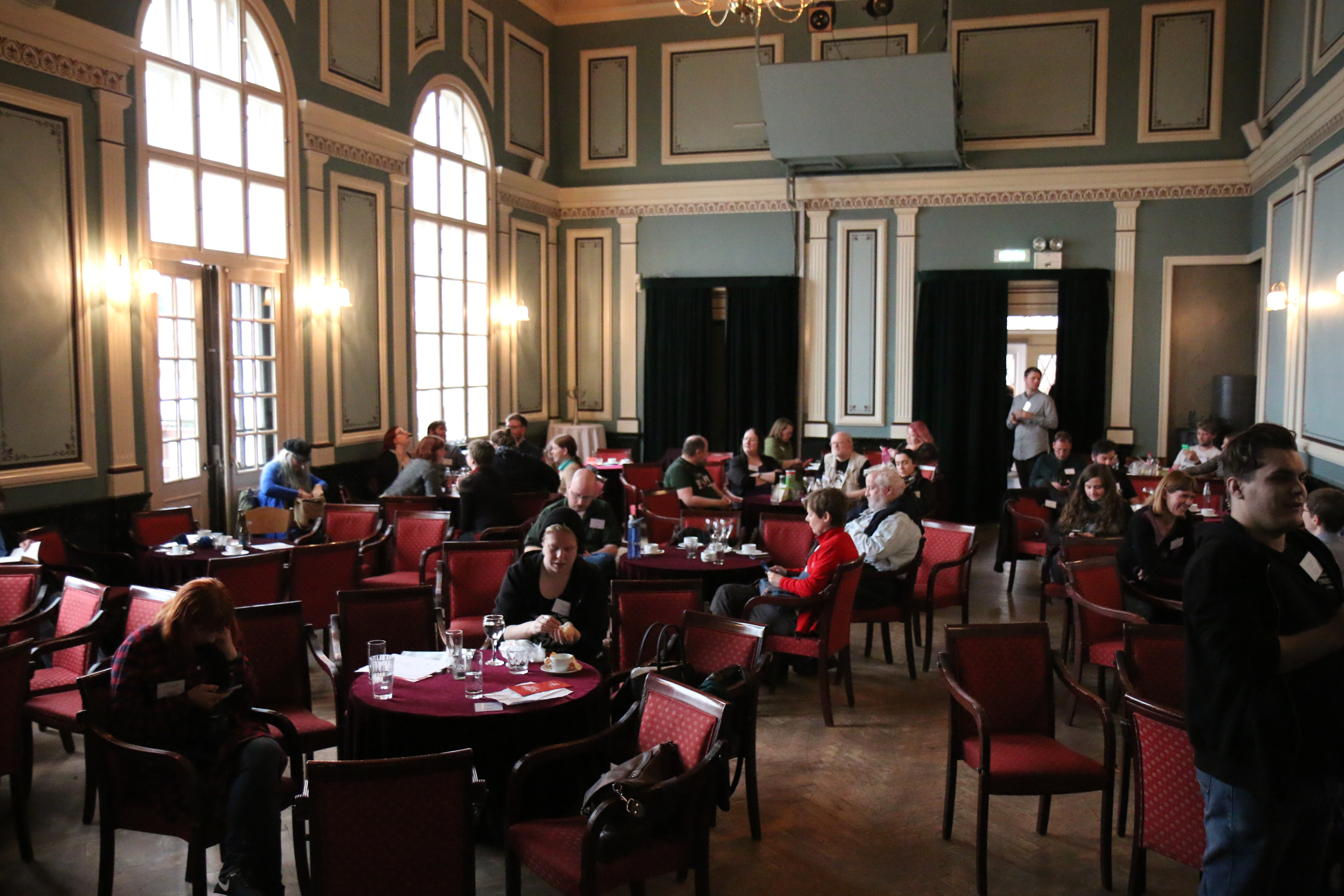
Audience in between programme items, 2016.
