= Fanaticon =

Science fiction convention

- Status: Ongoing
- Genre: Multi-genre
- Frequency: Annually
- Locations: Dothan, Alabama
- Country: United States
- Inaugurated: November 16, 2013
- Founder: Phillip Chalker
- Attendance: 2100+
- Website: alabamafanaticon.org

Fanaticon is an annual multi-genre, science-fiction, fantasy, comic book, anime, and gaming convention held in the southeastern area of Alabama. Its inaugural event was held on November 16, 2013, in Dothan, Alabama. Phillip Chalker, the event's organizer, is the owner of Fanatix Card and Game Shop and says that the idea came from a joke, but then took it a step further and held a Kickstarter campaign that generated the necessary revenue in about two hours. The first convention hosted a Magic: The Gathering Pro Tour Qualifier in which the winner received $1,000 in cash and prizes and a ticket to the next round of competition held in Spain. Fanaticon also hosts a costume contest of 100 average number of competitors. Fanaticon is committed to bringing a great family experience to the Wiregrass.

== Previous conventions ==
=== 2013 ===
Fanaticon Alpha had many notable guests and fans from a broad spectrum in the entertainment world. From the ranks of science-fiction writers was author, Jason Woodham, (Blaze: A Superhero Origin Story, Book One of The High-Born Epic, and What Warriors Will Stand). Coming from the comic's community was graphic novelist Brett Brooks (Dust Bunny). Fanaticon also had individuals from the film industry on hand, including filmmaker Joshua Sheik (Christian's Carol) and special effects make-up artist Matt Silva (The Walking Dead, The Book of Eli, SyFy's Face Off (TV series)), as featured panelists. Video game designer and founder of Square Peg Projekts, Daniel Alexander and DJ Tom Jones were also in attendance.

Many costume groups attended the event as well. This included members of one of the largest Star Wars fan groups, the 501st Legion. The Alabama Ghostbusters; Enterprise's Boll Weevil Bruisers; the Society for Creative Anachronism, and Dagorhir were also groups associated with Fanaticon. The event had an attendance in excess of 400 individuals.

=== 2014 ===
On November 15–16, 2014, the second Fanaticon, Fanaticon Beta, was held in Enterprise, Alabama. Many guests from Fanaticon Alpha were present, including the 501st Legion, The Alabama Ghostbusters, artist Brett Brooks, author Jason Woodham, filmmaker Joshua Sheik, make-up FX artist Matt Silva from Face Off (TV Series), and the Fogwalkers. Many new guests participated, including artist Tran Nguyen, actress Sonya Thompson from The Walking Dead and Zombieland, Johnny Yong Bosch (who portrayed Adam Park in "Mighty Morphin Power Rangers"), Java Moody of Ebed Pictures, Jason Sheedy of Returnstyle Pictures, artist Jayson Kretzer, Inverse Press comic book publishers, and Columbia Manor Haunted House from Columbia, AL. Musical guests included Johnny Yong Bosch's band Eyeshine and The Offer from Panama City, FL.

Tournaments for SSBB: Project M, SSB: Melee, SSB4 on Wii U, and Ultra Street Fighter IV were also held. Over 900 attendees were present at Fanaticon Beta, a significant growth in attendance from the initial Fanaticon.

=== 2015 ===
Fanaticon Prime took place November 14–15 and was held for the first time at the Ozark Civic Center in Ozark, Alabama. Guests attending were Ian Sinclair (voice actor) known for his voice acting work and directing. Make-up FX artist Matt Silva and many more artist and vendors. Musical Guest included The Offer Band. Over 1100 attendees were present at our third year event. Over 90 costumed individuals competed in one of the biggest cosplay events in South Alabama. And panels, anime, and video gaming events ran throughout the event.

=== 2016 ===
There was no convention for 2016. Director Phillip Chalker worked on the introduction to the 3rd location for event host Fanatix Comics and Games as well as the expansion of a Coffee Shop to the original location of Fanatix Comics and Games.

=== 2017 ===
Fanaticon 2017 featured over 1,000 attendees and hosted celebrities Jason Marsden, Courtney Taylor, and Matt Silva.

=== 2018 ===
Due to the need for more space for a safer event, Fanaticon moved to the Dothan Civic Center in 2018, due to lack of dates the earliest the event could be held to incorporate the planning of the event was October 4–6, 2019 (See Upcoming Events)

In lieu of a 2018 event Fanaticon planned and started a new Annual event for Dothan, Alabama: The Yule Ball Dinner. It was hosted at the Highland Oaks Clubhouse December 8, 2018

=== 2019 ===
Fanaticon 2019 took place at The Dothan Civic Center, Opera House, and Wiregrass Museum of Art. Its attendance doubled to 2100 attendees and featured guests Maile Flanagan (Naruto), Phil Lamarr (Samurai Jack), George Lowe (Space Ghost), Rodger Bumpass (Squidward), and WWE Hall of Famer, Good Ol' JR Jim Ross. It also featured Sonya Thompson of The Walking Dead, Make-up FX artist Matt Silva, The 501st, and much more.

== Upcoming conventions (2020) ==
The 2020 event was cancelled due to Covid-19 policies and mandates.

At this time there are no plans for the future of Fanaticon.
