= ConGlomeration (convention) =

Fan convention held in Kentucky, US

- Status: Defunct
- Genre: Multi-genre
- Venue: Crowne Plaza Louisville
- Location: Louisville, Kentucky
- Country: United States
- Inaugurated: 2001
- Most recent: 2019
- Attendance: 700
- Website: www.conglomeration.info

ConGlomeration was an annual multigenre convention held in or around Louisville, Kentucky, between 2001 and 2019. ConGlomeration was an all-volunteer non-profit organization which, as part of its convention programming, conducted charitable activities on behalf of the American Cancer Society and Cabbage Patch Settlement House. With the unexpected closure of the convention's hotel in 2008, the operation of the convention was disrupted, but resumed in 2010. The final ConGlomeration, ConGlomeration 2020, was scheduled to be held at the Crowne Plaza Hotel in Louisville on Easter weekend, April 10–12, 2020, but was cancelled due to COVID-19.

== Activities ==
ConGlomeration was a fan convention, incorporating aspects of a gaming convention, science fiction convention and, in 2006, 2007 and 2008, a writing workshop run by Apex Magazine. A 24-hour staffed game room, a LARP, tracked author programming, a cosplay masquerade competition, a dealer's room, and a genre art auction are regular components of ConGlomeration's official activities.

== Mascot ==
The convention mascot was a platypus that donned various disguises —- including a giant mecha robot, a homage to Gandalf, and King Kong—for his appearance on the official con T-shirt, which was given to staff and volunteers.

== See also ==
- List of attractions and events in the Louisville metropolitan area
- List of multigenre conventions
- List of science fiction conventions
