= SFWA Nebula Conference =

The SFWA Nebula Conference is an annual event at which the Science Fiction and Fantasy Writers of America gathers to honor outstanding work in the fields of science fiction and fantasy. Conference activities include professional sessions, tours, and a formal awards banquet at which the Nebula Awards are presented. The Nebula Awards have been presented annually since 1966, and the event was known as the Nebula Awards Weekend until 2014.

== Events ==
The Nebula conference is held each spring in various locations within the United States. The weekend usually, but not always, consists of professional sessions to help writers improve their work, better manage their careers, and network with agents, editors, and fellow writers. Tickets to the weekend's events, are open to the public. Attendees do not have to be a nominee, a member of SFWA, or even an author.

=== Past ===
- The 1989 Weekend was held in New York, New York.
- The 1991 Weekend was held in New York, New York.
- The 1992 Weekend was held in Atlanta, Georgia.
- The 1993 Weekend was held in New Orleans, Louisiana.
- The 1995 Weekend was held in New York, New York.
- The 1996 Weekend was held in Long Beach, California.
- The 1997 Weekend was held in Kansas City, Missouri.
- The 1998 Weekend was held in Santa Fe, New Mexico.
- The 1999 Weekend was held in Pittsburgh, Pennsylvania.
- The 2000 Weekend was held in New York, New York.
- The 2001 Weekend was held at the Beverly Hilton Hotel in Los Angeles, California.
- The 2002 Weekend was held in Kansas City, Kansas.
- The 2003 Weekend was held in Philadelphia, Pennsylvania.
- The 2004 Weekend was held in Seattle, Washington.
- The 2005 Weekend was held April 27-May 1, 2005, at the Allegro Hotel in Chicago, Illinois.
- The 2006 Weekend was held May 4-7, 2006, at the Mission Palms Hotel in Tempe, Arizona, site of the 2004 World Fantasy Convention.
- The 2007 Weekend was held May 11-13, 2007, at the Marriott Financial Center in New York City.
- The 2008 Weekend was held April 25-27, 2008, at the Omni Austin Hotel Downtown in Austin, Texas.
- The 2009 Weekend was held April 24-26, 2009, at the Luxe Hotel in Los Angeles, California.
- The 2010 Weekend was held May 14-16, 2010, at the Hilton Cocoa Beach Oceanfront hotel in Cocoa Beach, Florida.
- The 2011 Weekend was held May 19-22, 2011, at the Washington Hilton in Washington, DC.
- The 2012 Weekend was held May 17-20, 2012 at the Hyatt Regency hotel in Crystal City, Virginia.
- The 2013 Weekend was held May 16-19, 2013 at the Hilton San Jose in San Jose, California.
- The 2014 Weekend was held May 15-18, 2014 at the San Jose Marriott in San Jose, California.
- The 2015 Conference was held June 4-7, 2015 at the Palmer House Hilton in Chicago, Illinois.
- The 2016 Conference was held May 12-15, 2016 at the Palmer House Hilton in Chicago, Illinois.
- The 2017 Conference was held May 18-21, 2017 at the Pittsburgh Marriott City Center in Pittsburgh, Pennsylvania.
- The 2018 Conference was held May 17-20, 2018 at the Pittsburgh Marriott City Center in Pittsburgh, Pennsylvania.
- The 2019 Conference was held May 16-19, 2019 at the Marriott Warner Center in Woodland Hills, California.
- The 2020 Nebula Awards was scheduled to be held on May 28-31, 2020, at the Marriott Warner Center in Woodland Hills, California. The COVID-19 pandemic resulted in an announcement that the conference was to take place entirely on-line from May 29-31.
- The 2022 Conference was held May 20-22, 2022.
- The 2023 Conference was held May 12-14, 2023 at the Sheraton Park Hotel and online at the Anaheim Resort in Anaheim, California.
- The 2024 Conference was held June 6-8, 2023 at the Westin Pasadena and online in Pasadena, California.
- The 2025 Conference was held June 5-7, 2025 at the Marriott Country Club Plaza and online in Kansas City, Missouri.

=== Upcoming ===
- The 2026 Conference is to be held June 2-7, 2026 at the Crowne Plaza Chicago O'Hare Hotel & Conference Center in Rosemont, Illinois.
