= Hildur Knútsdóttir =

Icelandic writer and politician

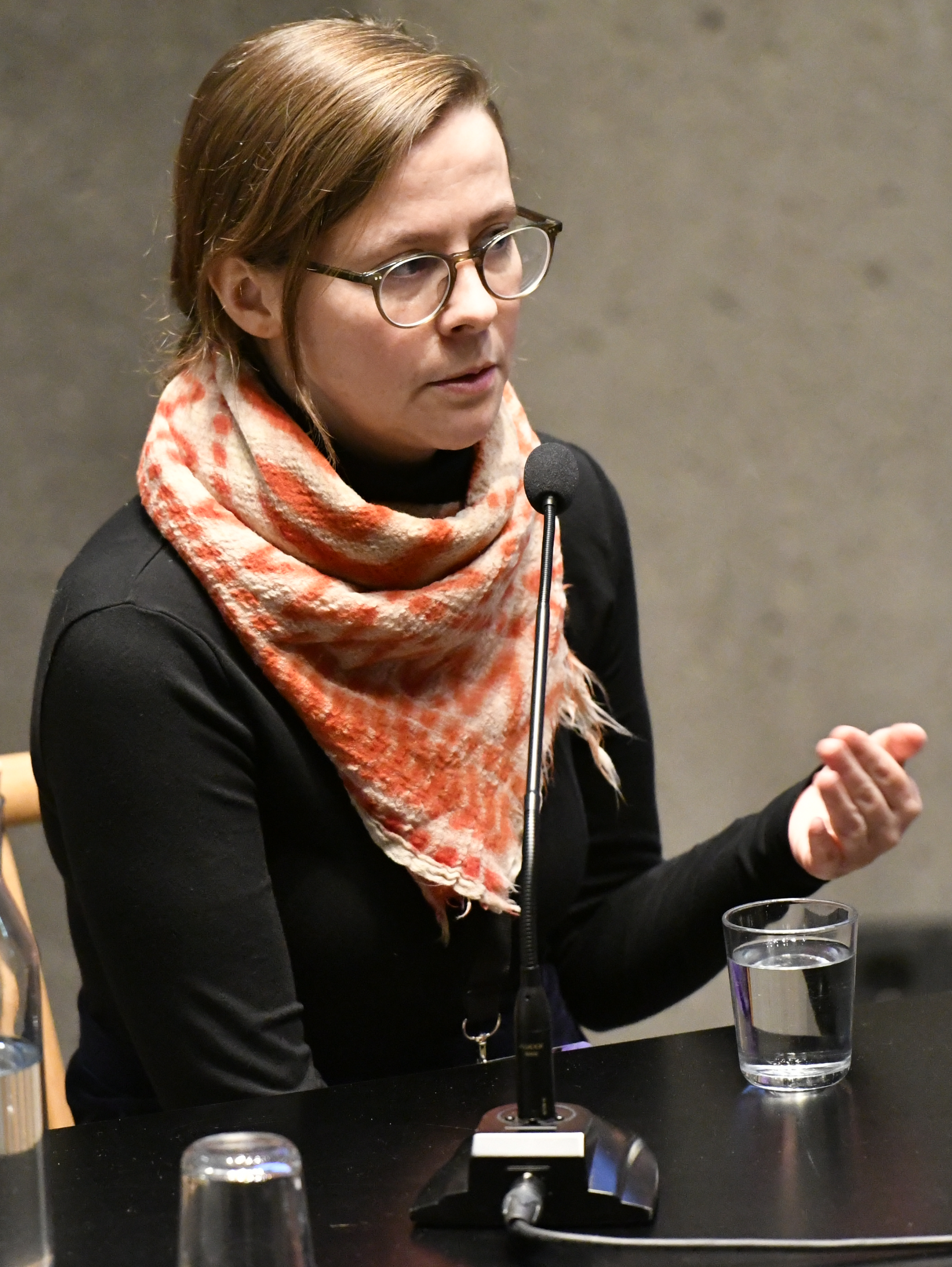
Hildur Knútsdóttir at Icecon in Reykjavík in 2024.

Hildur Knútsdóttir (born 16 June 1984, in Reykjavík) is an Icelandic writer. In 2016, she won the Icelandic Literary Prize for children's books for her novel Vetrarhörkur (Winter Frost).

She studied at University of Iceland. She taught a writing workshop.

== Political career ==
In March 2017, Hildur served briefly as a member of parliament for the Left-Green Movement to relieve Kolbeinn Óttarsson Proppé. In 2018, she left the party, citing dissatisfaction with a lack of progress in negotiations between the state and the Icelandic Association of Midwives.

== Publications ==
- Sláttur (2011)
- Spádómurinn (2012)
- Ævintýraeyjan: þrautir, leikir, gátur og skemmtun! (2014)
- Draugaljósið (2015)
- Vetrarfrí (2015)
- Vetrarhörkur (Winter Frost) (2016)
  - Dernier hiver (in French). Translated by Salaün, Jean-Christophe. 2018-04-18.
  - Krvavá zima (in Czech). Translated by Klímová, Nikola Janíčková. 2018.
- Doddi: Bók sannleikans with Þórdís Gísladóttir (2016)
- Doddi: Ekkert rugl! with Þórdís Gísladóttir (2017)
- Ljónið (2018)
- Orðskýringar (2018)
- Nornin (2019)
- Hingað og ekki lengra with Þórdís Gísladóttir (2020)
- Skógurinn (2020)
- Nú er nóg komið! with Þórdís Gísladóttir (2021)
- Myrkrið milli stjarnanna (2021)
  - The Night Guest. Translated by Kowal, Mary Robinette. Tor Nightfire. 2024-09-03. ISBN 978-1-250-32204-3.
- Urðarhvarf (2023)
- Hrím (2023)
- Mandla (2024)
- Kasia og Magdalena (2024)
- Gestir (2025)
  - Dead Weight. Translated by Kowal, Mary Robinette. Tor Nightfire. 2026-05-26. ISBN 978-1-250-32929-5.

== Awards ==
Sources:

- 2015: Icelandic Literary Prize, nominated: Vetrarfrí
- 2016: Fjöruverðlaunin: Vetrarfrí
- 2016: Icelandic Literary Prize: Vetrarhörkur
- 2016: Icelandic Literary Prize, nominated: Doddi: Bók sannleikans
- 2018: Icelandic Literary Prize, nominated: Ljónið
- 2019: Icelandic Literary Prize, nominated: Nornin
- 2020: Icelandic Literary Prize, nominated: Skógurinn
- 2023: Icelandic Literary Prize, nominated: Hrím
- 2024: Icelandic Literary Prize, nominated: Kasia og Magdalena
- 2026: Locus Award for Best Short Story, finalist: "The Shape of Stones"
