= Maleyevka seminars =

Maleyevka seminars (Russian: Малеевские семинары) were Soviet science fiction conventions. They could be traced back to 1982 when the first All-Union seminar of young science fiction and adventure genre writers took place in the sub-Moscow creative work house "Maleyevka". Because of the location, even a newly formed trend in the Soviet science fiction of 1980s acquired the name of Maleyevka. The name of conventions remained when they moved to Dubulty.

The first seminar took place on November 10, 1982, embracing 26 people from 21 cities. Among the heads of conventions were Dmitriy Bilenkin and Gennadiy Prashkevich. In 1990 the highest Soviet award in the branch of science fiction (the Aelita Prize) was given to Maleyevka participant Oleg Korabelnikov.
