= Engelsfors =

Swedish young adult fantasy trilogy

- Cover of the first novel in the series (Swedish)
- The Circle; Fire; The Key
- Author: Mats Strandberg; Sara Bergmark Elfgren
- Country: Sweden
- Language: Swedish
- Genre: Young adult fiction Urban fantasy Horror
- No. of books: 3

Engelsfors is a Swedish young adult fantasy trilogy written by Mats Strandberg and Sara Bergmark Elfgren. All three novels in the series have been translated into English.

A Swedish film adaptation of the first book in the series, Cirkeln (English: The Circle), was released on February 18, 2015. There are plans to film adaptions of the second and third books if the first film is a commercial success.

== The Circle ==
The Circle (Swedish: Cirkeln) is the first book in the Engelsfors trilogy. The novel takes place in a fictional rural town, Engelsfors, in central Sweden, and follows a group of teenage girls with little in common who discover that they are witches. The girls, known as the Chosen Ones, are destined to save the world from an approaching apocalypse caused by an otherworldly evil ("demons").

In addition to the fantasy theme, the novel also uses tropes of horror fiction, psychological realism and the unreliable narrator. The novel has been sold for publication in over twenty different languages, in addition to its native Swedish. Random House released the English translation in the U.K. on June 7, 2012, and in other English-speaking countries during the summer of 2012.

The novel won Bokbloggarnas litteraturpris which is awarded by major Swedish book bloggers, as well as Bokjuryn, where over 30,000 Swedish children and young adults vote for their favorite books. It was nominated for the August Prize youth award in 2011.

== Fire ==
Fire takes place about 10 weeks after the events of the first novel. It follows the same fantasy like the first and further develops themes of horror fiction, psychological realism and an unreliable narrator(s). The plot also makes analogies to the effects of global warming on Sweden's subarctic climate and the group behaviour dynamics of political, religious and ideological extremist groups.

== The Key ==
The final part in the series was published in English in the United States in October 2015. The novel concludes the story of the Chosen Ones.
