= Mats Strandberg =

Swedish author

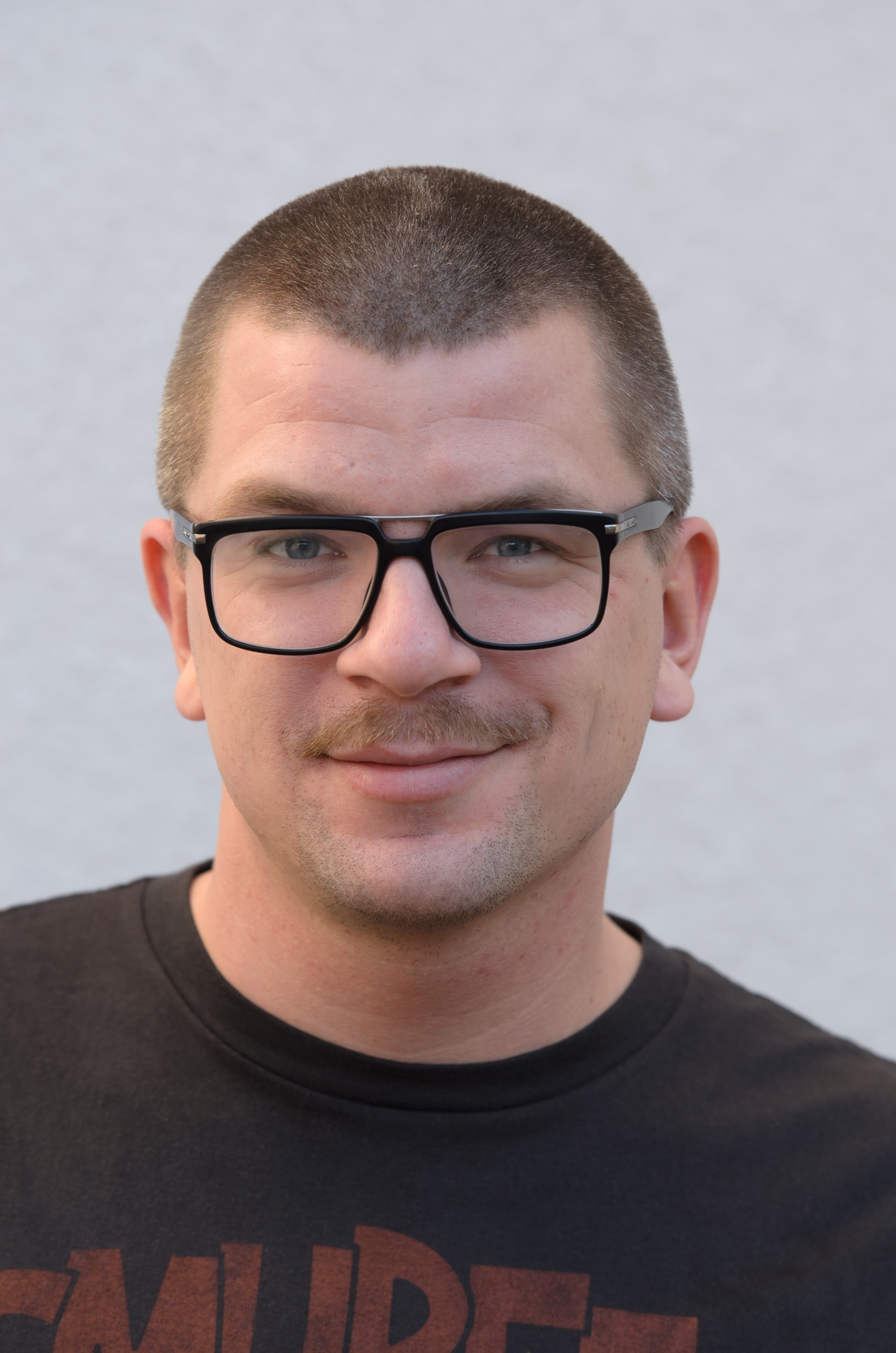
- Mats Strandberg at Swecon 2012
- Born: 1976 (age 49–50)
- Occupations: Author and columnist
- Spouse: Johan Ehn (m. 2015)
- Website: matsstrandberg.com

Mats Olof Erling Strandberg (born 1976) is a Swedish author.

Strandberg has been a columnist in Aftonbladet. His debut novel was Jaktsäsong, published in 2006. His young adult fantasy novel Cirkeln, the first book in the Engelsfors trilogy written together with Sara Bergmark Elfgren and published in 2011, was an August Prize nominee in the youth literature category.

Strandberg has also written horror novels. In 2015, his novel Färjan, which is set on board a Baltic Sea cruiseferry, was published. It was translated into English as Blood Cruise and published in the UK by Jo Fletcher Books. Hemmet, about a residential care home haunted by ghosts, was published in 2017; Slutet, a preapocalyptic young adult novel about the final few weeks of life on Earth before a comet destroys all life, was released in 2018 and received very positive reviews in Dagens Nyheter and SVT. Konferensen, a horror novel about a corporate conference the site of a rampaging slasher, released in 2021 and was film adapted in 2023.

Strandberg is married to the actor Johan Ehn.

== Bibliography ==
- Jaktsäsong, 2007
- Bekantas bekanta, 2008
- Halva liv, 2009
- The Engelsfors trilogy (with Sara Bergmark Elfgren)
  - Cirkeln, 2011; published in English as The Circle, 2012
  - Eld, 2012; published in English as Fire, 2014
  - Nyckeln, 2013; published in English as The Key, 2015
- Färjan, 2015; published in English as Blood Cruise, 2017
- Hemmet, 2017; published in English as The Home, 2020
- Slutet, 2018; published in English as The End, 2020
- Konferensen, 2021
- Musan, 2025
