= The Circle (Elfgren and Strandberg novel) =

Novel by Mats Strandberg and Sara Bergmark Elfgren

- First edition
- Author: Mats Strandberg and Sara Bergmark Elfgren
- Original title: Cirkeln
- Language: Swedish
- Series: The Engelsfors Trilogy
- Genre: Young adult fiction, Urban fantasy, Horror
- Publisher: Rabén & Sjögren (Swedish), Random House (English)
- Publication date: April 2011 (Sweden), June 2012 (United Kingdom)
- Publication place: Sweden
- Media type: Print (Paperback and hardback)
- Pages: 516 (hardback)
- ISBN: 978-1468306583
- LC Class: PZ7.E386 Ci
- Followed by: Fire

The Circle (Swedish title Cirkeln) is a Swedish young adult fantasy novel written by Mats Strandberg and Sara Bergmark Elfgren. It is the first part of the Engelsfors trilogy. The novel takes place in a fictional rural town in Bergslagen in central Sweden and follows a group of teenage girls with little in common who discover that they are witches chosen to save the world from an otherworldly evil. In addition to the fantasy theme, the novel also uses tropes of horror fiction, psychological realism and the unreliable narrator. The novel has been sold for publication in 21 different languages in addition to Swedish. Random House released the English translation in the UK on June 7, 2012, and in other English-speaking countries during the summer of 2012.

The novel won Bokbloggarnas litteraturpris which is awarded by major Swedish book bloggers, as well as Bokjuryn, where over 30,000 Swedish children and young adults vote for their favourite books, and it was nominated for the August Prize youth award in 2011.

== Plot ==
The novel follows the six "chosen ones" Minoo, Rebecka, Vanessa, Anna-Karin, Ida, and Linnéa, all of whom are first-year students at the same secondary school. Ida and Linnéa are not featured as point of view characters in the novel for thematic and narrative purposes. The characters soon come off as unreliable narrators as their description of themselves and other characters do not match each other, such as Minoo's comments on Rebecka's beauty and Anna-Karin's on her own weight. The apparent suicide of Linnéa's "brother in all but blood" Elias becomes the start of a series of strange events in the town.

== Characters ==
- Minoo Falk Karimi – an excellent student and a teacher's pet. She, along with Linnéa, accidentally discovers Elias' body at the start of the novel. She forms a close friendship with Rebecka and, later, Linnéa. She has a crush on Max, one of her teachers.
- Rebecka Mohlin – a girl with a history of anorexia, Rebecka is popular and is dating Gustaf. Rebecka forms a close friendship with Minoo and strongly believes the Chosen Ones should stick together.
- Anna-Karin Nieminen – an only child who lives with her mother and grandfather on a farm. An outcast and a frequent subject of bullying, she has serious self-image and self-esteem issues.
- Vanessa Dahl – an outgoing, popular girl who is considered a slut by her peers, Vanessa is a party girl who tends to date older men. In the novel, she is dating Wille. She becomes best friends with Linnéa.
- Linnéa Wallin – a goth and a social outcast who lives alone in social services provided housing to due a dead mother and alcoholic father. She had a brother-sister type relationship with Elias and later becomes best friends with Vanessa.
- Ida Holmström – a popular girl and a bully who is secretly in love with Gustaf. She is reluctant to be friends with the other Chosen Ones.
- Nicolaus Elingius – the school janitor who is mysteriously designed to be the protector of the Chosen Ones.
- Adriana Lopez – the school principal and an agent of the magic-policing "Council" who helps instruct the Chosen Ones with their roles and powers.
- Gustaf Åhlander – Rebecka's boyfriend, he later grows close to Minoo.
- Elias Malmgren – a troubled boy who has a brother-sister relationship with Linnéa. He is forced to commit suicide at the start of the novel by a sinister force. He was unaware of his status as one of the Chosen Ones.
- Max Rosenqvist – a handsome teacher with whom Minoo is secretly in love.
- Wille – Vanessa's older, stoner boyfriend. He is also Linnéa's ex-boyfriend.
- Matilda Elingia – the original Chosen One who was burned to death approximately 400 years ago during the time of the Swedish Witch Trials.

== Critical reception ==
Cirkeln received positive reviews in Dagens Nyheter, Tidningarnas Telegrambyrå and Skånska Dagbladet.

== Film adaptation ==
A film adaptation was to be produced by Filmlance with Levan Akin set to direct and Sara Bergmark Elfgren as scriptwriter. The production was put on hold due to disagreements between the authors and Filmlance. Akin left the project as well. The details remain unrevealed.

In April 2013, Benny Andersson of ABBA announced that he had bought the rights to the film from Filmlance. The film The Circle was shot during March - July 2014 by Andersson's production company RMV Film and was released in February 2015.
