= Sara Bergmark Elfgren =

Swedish writer and screenwriter

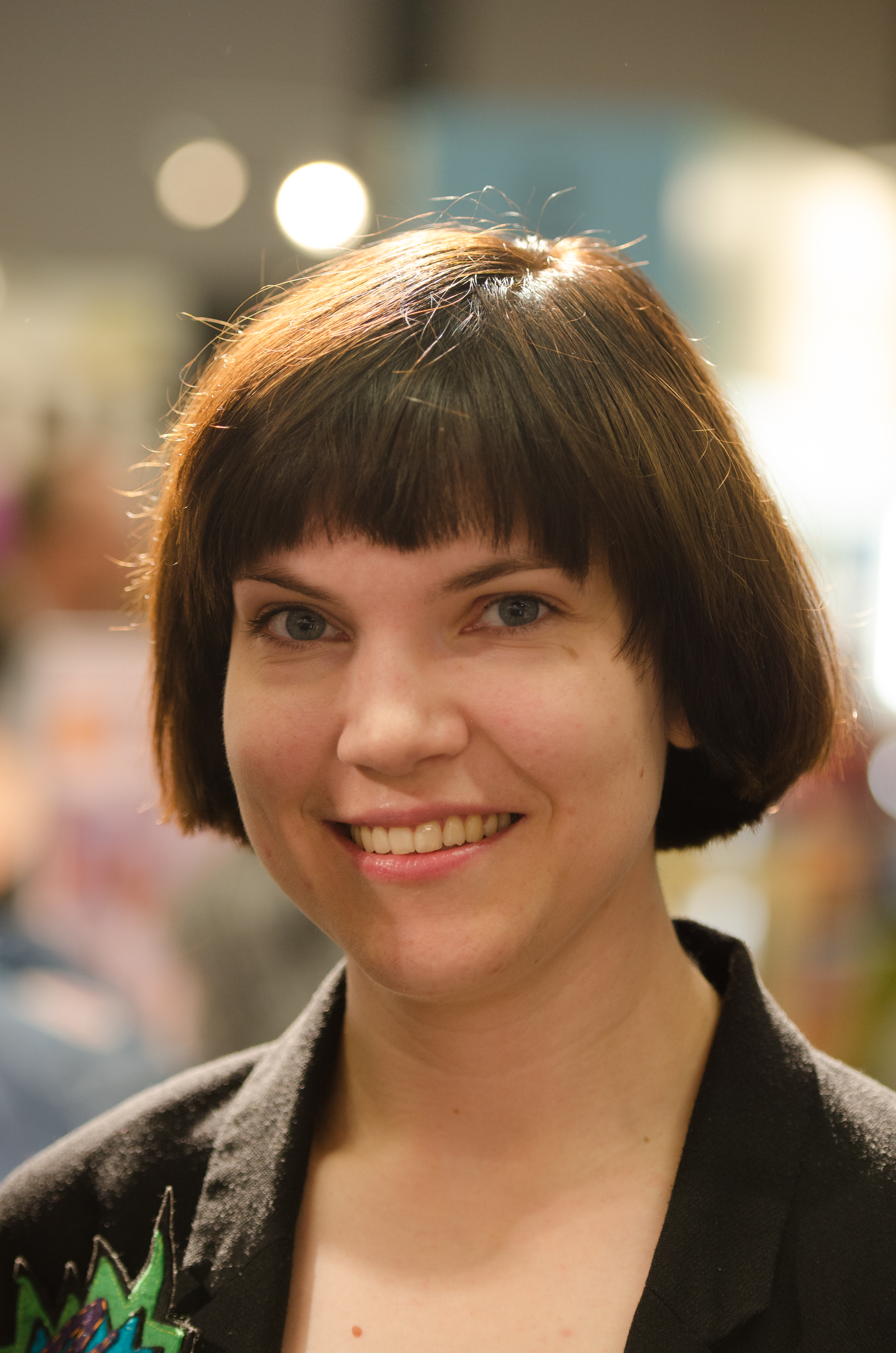
Sara Bergmark Elfgren in 2012.

Sara Bergmark Elfgren (born 1980) is a Swedish writer and screenwriter.

== Writing ==
Her first novel, Cirkeln (The Circle), and the sequels Eld (Fire) and Nyckeln (The Key) (known collectively as the Engelsfors trilogy), were written together with Mats Strandberg and published in 2011–2013. Cirkeln was an August Prize nominee in the youth literature category. The books have been translated into 25 languages.

In 2016, Bergmark Elfgren created and wrote the radio mockumentary thriller De dödas röster (Voices of the Dead) which received favourable reviews. It was nominated to Prix Europa.

Her novel Norra Latin was published in 2017. It is a supernatural young adult novel set at the Norra Latin secondary school in Stockholm; in the novel, the school was never closed, and it houses a theatre programme where the story's main characters are students.

Together with artist Karl Johnsson she created the graphic novel Vei, the first part of which was published in 2017, an epic fantasy story inspired by Norse mythology.

== Bibliography ==
=== Engelsfors trilogy ===
- Cirkeln (2011) (with Mats Strandberg)
- Eld (2012) (with Mats Strandberg)
- Nyckeln (2013) (with Mats Strandberg)

=== Novels ===
- Norra Latin (2017)
- Grim (2021)

=== Graphic novels ===
- Vei – book 1 (with Karl Johnsson)
- Vei – book 2 (with Karl Johnsson)
