= Icon (disambiguation) =

An icon is a religious work of art, most commonly a painting, in the cultures of several churches.

Icon may also refer to:

== General concepts ==
- an icon in the semiotic theory of Charles Sanders Peirce
- Iconicity, in functional-cognitive linguistics,
- Pictogram, a graphic symbol
- Icon (computing), a graphic symbol displayed on a computer screen
- Cultural icon, something or someone representative of a given culture
  - Pop icon, a celebrity or object that constitutes a defining characteristic of a society or era
  - Architectural icon, a groundbreaking or unique building
  - Gay icon, a public figure regarded as a cultural icon

== Arts, entertainment and media ==
=== Fictional characters ===
- Icon (character), a Milestone/DC comic book superhero
- Icon the Ungodly, a character from The world of Legend

=== Film and television ===
- Icon (film), 2005, loosely based on the Frederick Forsyth novel
- Icons (TV series), an American documentary TV show
- "Icon" (Stargate SG-1), a 2004 TV episode

=== Literature ===
- Icon (novel), by Frederick Forsyth, 1997
- Icon, a novel by Bodie and Brock Thoene
- iCon, a 2005 biography of Steve Jobs by Jeffrey Young
- Icons: Creativity with Camera and Computer, an illustrated book by photographer Douglas Kirkland
- Icon (architecture magazine), British architecture and design magazine
- Icon (lifestyle magazine), a fashion and celebrity magazine
- ICON, a Singapore magazine published by SPH Media
- ICON, a magazine published by International Committee for the History of Technology
- International Journal of Constitutional Law

=== Music ===
- Icon (band), an American rock band
  - Icon (Icon album), 1984
- No Min-woo, stage name ICON, South Korean actor and musician
- Icon (album series), a series of compilation albums released by Universal Music Enterprises
- Icon (Benighted album) (2007)
- Icon (Brent Faiyaz album) (2026)
- Icon (John Lennon album) (2014)
- Icon (Paradise Lost album) (1993)
- Icon (Tony Effe album) (2024)
- Icon (Trisha Yearwood album) (2010)
- Icon (Vince Gill album) (2010)
- Icon (Wetton and Downes album) (2005)
- DAAS Icon, a 1990 comedy album by Doug Anthony All Stars
- Icon 2 (2011), an album by George Strait
- Icons, a 2021 album by Eli Keszler
- Icons (None More Black album) (2010)
- "Icon" (song), by Jaden Smith, 2017
- "Icon", a 2021 song by Twice from the album Formula of Love: O+T=<3
- "Icons", a 2021 song by Hot Issue
- The Singles 1992–2003, a greatest hits album by No Doubt, re-released as Icon

=== Other uses in arts and entertainment ===
- Icon (roller coaster), a roller coaster at Blackpool Pleasure Beach, UK
- Def Jam: Icon, a 2007 fighting video game
- Icon, a series of annual exhibitions held at JamFactory in Adelaide, South Australia

== Businesses and organizations ==
=== Businesses and brands ===
- ICON (blockchain platform)
- ICON Aircraft, an American aircraft manufacturer
- Icon Books, a London-based publisher
- Icon Comics, a Marvel comics imprint
- Icon Construction, Australian company purchased by Kajima in 2017
- Icon Films, a British independent television production company
- Icon Group International and Icon Health Publications, a publisher of automatically generated books compiled from Internet sources
- ICON PLC, a healthcare intelligence and clinical research organisation
- Icon Productions, formerly Icon Entertainment International, an American independent production company
- Hotel Icon (Houston), a hotel in Houston, Texas, US
- Nokia Lumia Icon, a smartphone
- ICON, a 3D concrete printing technology company

=== Organizations ===
- Consorzio ICoN, an interuniversity consortium for Italian Studies
- Icon FC, a soccer club in New Jersey, United States
- Icon Theatre, a British theatre company
- Institute of Conservation, a British cultural heritage organisation
- International Council on Nanotechnology, a group concerned with risks and use of nanotechnology

== Science and technology ==
- Icon (programming language)
- ICON (microcomputer), built in the 1980s
- ICON (weather model), a weather prediction model of Deutscher Wetterdienst
- Ionospheric Connection Explorer (ICON), a defunct NASA satellite

== Transportation ==
- Icon-class cruise ship
  - Icon of the Seas, a Royal Caribbean International cruise ship
- Geely Icon, a sport utility vehicle

== Other uses ==
- List of ICON science fiction conventions, the name of at least five science fiction convention
- Icon Complex, a building in Hobart, Tasmania, Australia
- Iloilo Convention Center (ICON), a convention center in Iloilo City, Philippines

== See also ==
- Icahn (disambiguation)
- Icône, a residential tower in Montreal, Canada
- Ikon (disambiguation)
- Iconography, the content of images, and the study of that subject
