= List of ICON science fiction conventions =

ICON is the name of at least five science fiction conventions:

- ICON (Iowa science fiction convention) is held in the Cedar Rapids/Iowa City area since 1975, usually in late October or early November, under the auspices of the Mindbridge Foundation, a not-for-profit foundation which also sponsors the Gamicon and AnimeIowa conventions.
- I-CON is held in Stony Brook, New York, every spring, on the campus of Stony Brook University since 1981. I-CON (with a hyphen) is short for Island Convention – a reference to its location on Long Island.
- ICon festival is the main Israeli annual science fiction, fantasy and role-playing convention (now officially a festival) – standing for Israeli Convention. It has been held in Tel Aviv annually since 1996 during Sukkot.
- Icon was the name of the 2005 National Science Fiction Convention in New Zealand.
- iCON is an annual science fiction, fantasy and role-playing convention in Turkey, Istanbul held by the Science Fiction and Fantasy Club of Istanbul University.
