= Pop culture fiction =

Genre of fiction

Pop culture fiction is a genre of fiction where stories are written intentionally to be filled with references from other works and media. Stories in this genre are focused solely on using popular culture references.

== Criteria ==
Some works in the genre use pop culture references to elicit nostalgia among its consumers, while other examples have the whole setting and universe themselves built upon and revolving around pop cultural references. Pop culture fiction doesn't just reference one or two titles, but works under this genre reference several titles across different genres and media.

Many types of postmodern works and modern-day homage, metafiction, satires and parodies fall under this category. However, unlike more typically comedic satires and parodies, pop culture fiction contains depth, complexities and serious themes, with many even garnering critical acclaim. Many such stories have also been inspired by video games, horror, and geek culture.

== Examples ==
=== Notable pop culture fiction books ===
- Bret Easton Ellis' novel American Psycho (both the book and film) became one of the earliest examples of this genre with its endless use of brands and criticism on business and mindless consumerism.
- Ernest Cline's Ready Player One and Ready Player Two which extensively use 1980s pop culture as its themes.
- Chris Fox's The Dark Lord Bert is a Dungeons & Dragons-inspired gamelit filled with pop culture references.
- Louis Bulaong's Escapist Dream and Otaku Girl are notable examples that reference modern geek pop culture.
- Libriomancer by Jim C. Hines is an urban fantasy story about a sorcerer who fights enemies by pulling objects from books, including comic books and fantasy stories.

=== List of pop culture fiction in comic format ===
- Scott Pilgrim which used various 1980s gaming references.

=== List of pop culture fiction in films ===
- Shaun of the Dead (2004) is a zombie film that used various references to the Zombie Apocalypse genre.
- The Editor (2014)
- Toy Story 4 (2019) which had tremendous use of references to various toys compared to its predecessors.

== See also ==
- Pop art
- Postmodernist literature
  - Postmodernist film
  - Postmodern television
- Parody film
- Satire (film and television)
- Retro style
- Crossover fiction
