= Legend of the Seas =

Royal Caribbean International cruise ship

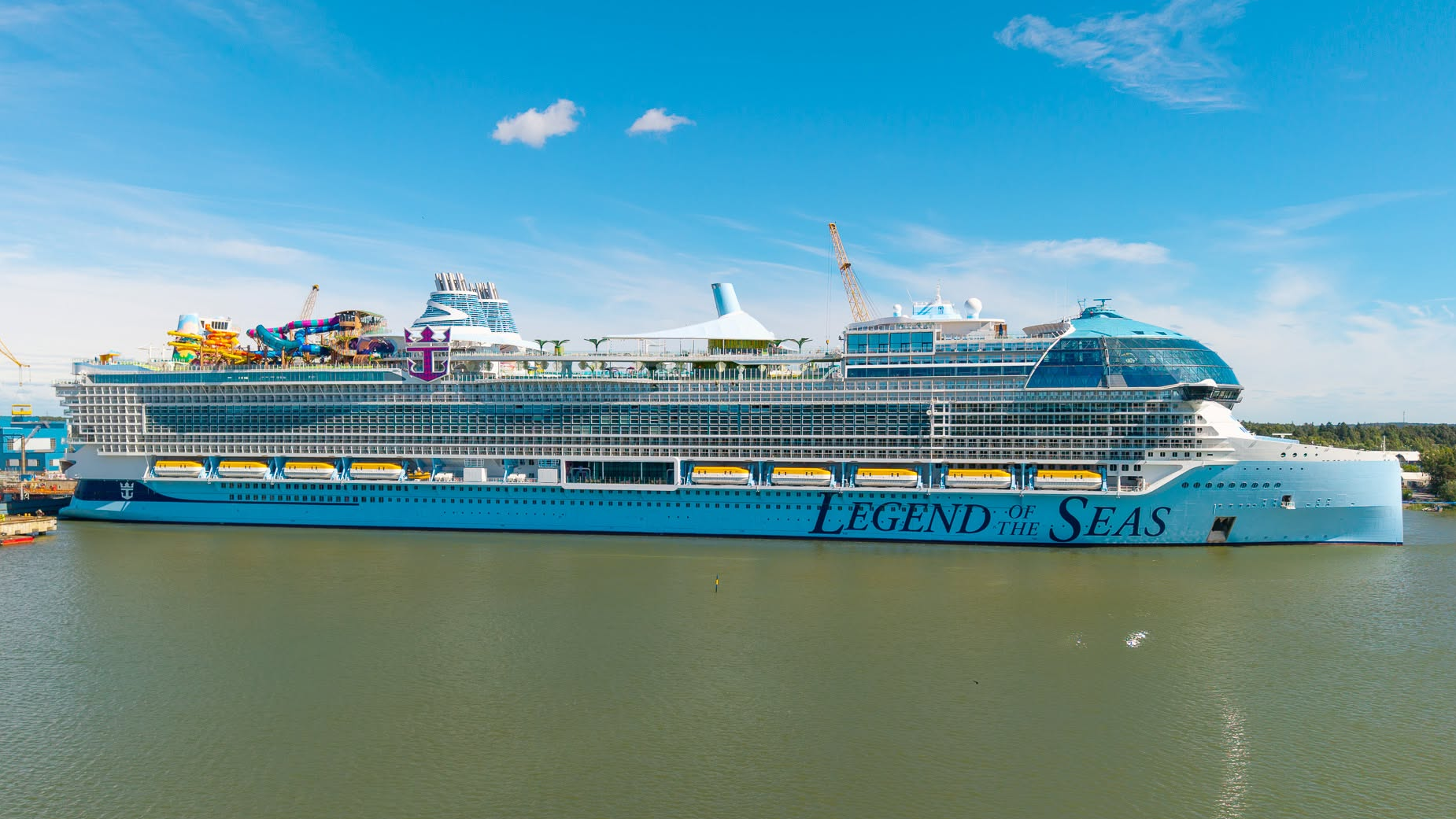
- Legend of the Seas in Meyer Turku shipyard

History
- Name: Legend of the Seas
- Owner: Royal Caribbean Group
- Operator: Royal Caribbean International
- Port of registry: Nassau, Bahamas
- Route: Western Mediterranean, then Western Caribbean
- Ordered: 18 December 2019
- Builder: Meyer Turku, Finland
- Cost: €2.33 billion
- Yard number: NB-1402
- Laid down: 7 October 2024
- Launched: 2 September 2025
- Completed: 30 April 2026
- Acquired: 10 June 2026
- Maiden voyage: 4 July 2026
- In service: 2026-present
- Identification: IMO number: 9888560; MMSI number: 311001716; Call sign: C6IN5; DNV ID: 42122
- Status: In Service

General characteristics
- Class & type: Icon-class cruise ship
- Tonnage: 248,663 GT, 307,895 NT
- Length: 364.84 metres (1,197.0 ft)
- Beam: 48.49 m (159.1 ft)
- Draft: 8.8 m (29 ft)
- Decks: 20 total (18 guest decks)
- Propulsion: 4 × Wärtsilä 12V46TS-DF, 15,240 kW (20,730 hp) each 2 × Wärtsilä 9L46TS-DF, 11,430 kW (15,540 hp) each
- Speed: 23 kn
- Capacity: 5,610 (double occupancy)
- Crew: 2,350

Legend of the Seas is an Icon-class cruise ship operated by Royal Caribbean International. She was built at the Meyer Turku shipyard in Turku, Finland. At 248,663 gross tonnage (GT), Legend of the Seas shares the title of the largest cruise ship in the world with her sister ships. After her summer 2026 season in the Western Mediterranean, Legend of the Seas will offer her primary sailing of the Western Caribbean operating out of Fort Lauderdale, Florida, United States.

== Naming ==
Legend of the Seas is the second cruise ship in the Royal Caribbean fleet to have carried the same name. The original Legend of the Seas (now Marella Discovery 2) was a Vision-class cruise ship launched on September 5, 1994, and served in Royal Caribbean's fleet until 2017, when it was sold to Marella Cruises. Royal Caribbean's Chief Marketing Officer Kara Wallace explained the company's reasoning behind bringing back the name.

The Icon Class as a name really sets a really high bar... so we needed a third name that really fit with that... Legend is, not only fitting of the class, but an homage to everything that came before it.

== Design ==
As designed, Legend of the Seas measures approximately 250,800 gross tonnage (GT), and has a capacity of approximately 5,610 passengers with double occupancy over its 2,805 cabins and a maximum capacity of 7,600 passengers.

Like the other Icon-class ships, Legend of the Seas is made up of various neighborhoods which include a plethora of activities, such as skywalks, surf simulators, waterparks, and pools.

As a part of Royal Caribbean's journey towards a net-zero cruise ship by 2035, Legend of the Seas is the company's fourth ship powered by liquefied natural gas (LNG), joining Utopia of the Seas, Icon of the Seas, and Star of the Seas.

Following a new trend, when docked the ship can plug-in the local grid (know as "shore power") enabling it then to shut-off all its engines (known as "cold ironing").

As of July 2026, seven pools, 20 bars and 28 restaurants were on board.

== Construction ==
Legend of the Seas was constructioned at the Meyer Turku shipyard in Turku, Finland. Its construction began with the first steel cutting, which occurred in January 2024. The ship's keel was laid in October 2024. On September 2, 2025, it was floated out to the outfitting pier, where construction was completed in 2026. On December 2, 2025, during construction there was a fire in the engine room, though it was not expected to affect the construction schedule. The ship started 2,400 nautical miles of sea trials in April 2026, prior to accepting passengers for its 2026 summer schedule. The ship was delivered to Royal Caribbean on 10 June 2026, and like its predecessors, it was height modified and just passed under the Great Belt Bridge, on 19 June 2026.

== Planned deployment ==
Legend of the Seas debuted in the Western Mediterranean in the Summer 2026 season, and in doing so, was be the first Icon-class cruise ship to offer sailings of Europe. The ship will offer 3 to 7-night cruises of the Western Mediterranean, primarily cruising out of Barcelona, Spain, and Rome, Italy.

When the Summer season concluded, the vessel relocated to Florida, US, where it will offer 3 to 8-night cruises of the Western and Southern Caribbean out of Port Everglades in Fort Lauderdale, Florida. For its relocation, Legend of the Seas offered a 13-night long, transatlantic cruise and arrived on the 7th November
