= Iconic =

The adjective iconic may describe:

- someone or something that is seen as a cultural icon
- a sign characterised by iconicity
- an image or technique typical of religious icons

Iconic may also refer to:

- Iconic (EP), a 2012 extended play by Icona Pop
- Iconic, a 2015 album by Jed Madela
- Iconic, the working title for Rebel Heart, a 2015 studio album by Madonna
  - "Iconic" (Madonna song), a 2015 song by Madonna featuring Chance the Rapper and Mike Tyson
- "Iconic", a 2018 song by Logic featuring Jaden Smith from YSIV
- "Iconic", a 2018 song by Poppy from Am I a Girl?
- "Iconic", a 2019 song by Trisha Paytas
- "Iconic", a 2021 song by Aespa from Savage
- "Iconic", a 2021 song by Bad Gyal from Warm Up
- "Iconic", a 2022 song by Simple Plan from Harder Than It Looks
- "Iconic", a 2024 song by Big Sean from Better Me Than You
- "Iconic" (A-Teens song), a 2026 song by A-Teens
- "Iconic", a 2026 song by Otonose Kanade and Ichijou Ririka
- Iconic (concert), a 2019 concert tour by Filipino singers Sharon Cuneta and Regine Velasquez
- Iconic Tower (Egypt), the highest skyscraper of Africa, located in the New Administrative Capital of Egypt
- The Iconic, a company in Australia

== See also ==
- Icon (disambiguation)
