= ICX =

ICX, ICx, or icx may refer to:

- ICx, a former name for the ICE 4 high-speed train in Germany
- ICX, abbreviation for Interconnection Exchange, a long-distance telecommunications operator in Bangladesh
- ICX Switch, a line of switching products by Brocade Communications Systems
- ICX Media, an analytics data company associated with Edward Burns
- International Charter Xpress (ICX), a former American airline that merged with Air Transport International
- ICX, abbreviation for Ice Lake Xeon Scalable, used on the roadmap of Intel's Tick–tock model
- ICX Technologies, developer of the Fido explosives detector
- Information Communication Extension, a specialized subject at Kenmore State High School
- India Cloud Xchange, a regional organization of Global Cloud Xchange
- icx, an executable name for the Intel C++ Compiler
- ImageCast X, voting equipment sold by Dominion Voting Systems
- ICX, a model of Ibanez Iceman guitar
- International Culture Exchange, an agency of the Church of Christ in Poland
- ICX Group, a professional services firm founded by Lenny Curry
- ICX, the native cryptocurrency of the ICON blockchain platform
