= MTV Generation =

Adolescents during the 1980s through 1990s

The MTV Generation refers to the adolescents and young adults of the 1980s to 2000s, a time when many were influenced by the television channel MTV, which launched in August 1981. The term was often used synonymously with Generation X and Millennials. The development of MTV "had an immediate impact on popular music, visual style, and culture". Through this impact, MTV has shaped the MTV Generation and a new "cultural force".

== History and background ==
The origin of the phrase has been attributed to the MTV Network itself "to describe the teenagers that dominate their ratings".

The phrase came into general use more than two years after the cable network's 1981 debut. One observer notes that "By 1984, MTV was reaching 1.2 percent of the daily television audience, and more than a quarter of daily teen viewers. Children of the 1980s would henceforth be known as 'the MTV Generation.'" As early as its October 13, 1984 issue, Billboard was using the term in reference to musical preferences. The phrase was later expanded to include the purchasing choices of a generation of consumers, with the J. Walter Thompson advertising agency describing the demographic in a 1985 presentation entitled "The New American Consumers", with one business columnist noting that "We baby boomers are raising what J. Walter calls the MTV Generation and these 12 to 19 year olds are unbelievably affluent..." Bret Easton Ellis was called the "voice of the MTV generation" as early as 1985, after the publication of his first novel, Less than Zero.

MTV broadcast a documentary titled MTV Generation in 1991. Reviewing it, the New York Times described the group as "young adults struggling to establish a cultural niche for themselves, something that will distinguish them from the hippies and baby boomers and yuppies of times past." The documentary depicts the MTV Generation as characterised by cynicism, uncertainty, and an ability to process information quickly, and focusing on diversions and retro interests. One article denotes how difficult teaching the MTV generation came to be and that during that time "today’s students have short attention spans, lower literacy rates than previous generations, and bore easily. They don’t hesitate to show their apathy and their looks, style, and age can be intimidating". The MTV Generation was not afraid to demonstrate their newfound attitudes and characteristics.

"Much has been written about the so-called "baby buster" generation—the fairly anonymous group of 20ish young adults struggling to separate themselves from the shadow of the baby boomers ... The group's moniker, "the MTV generation," might be the description yet. For while much has been made about the generation's lack of a single unifying theme or experience, its members seem to have 1 thing in common: music videos."

In 1991, author Douglas Coupland said of the label: "MTV would like to have us believe that everyone in their 20s is the MTV Generation. That's like going through life with a big product placement tattooed on your head, as if they're the only cultural influence on the entire planet." Coupland also said MTV had a mostly positive and profound impact on his generation. In 1991 he stated, "I was in Europe last summer and MTV is everywhere! It's in the bars, in the homes, in the coffee shops. I didn't realize how completely global it was and what it has done to homogenize youth culture."

In addition to defining themselves within their own generational terms, the MTV Generation also inhabited some negative connotations and depictions. The MTV Generation did not see the harm in what was being expressed to them on television and what they believed to be "just entertainment" was soon to be believed to be too mature for their generation. As John Chapin denotes, "like most media innovations, critics soon warned of deleterious effects on unsuspecting youthful consumers: shortened attention spans and sexual recklessness. The network quickly began censoring videos for sexual content". With raunchy music videos by artists like Madonna and explicit television shows like Jackass, "MTV appears to be responding to the challenge by banning violent music videos and producing original news segments and documentaries addressing teen issues".

The MTV generation also created new global economic trends and practices. As writer Steve Jones states, "in an era of globalization, when local and regional cultures are unsettled, fluid, and challenged by global culture, it is not surprising that multinational advertisers and marketers would seize upon a youth-oriented global brand such as MTV". The MTV generation equipped global industries to be able to fully adapt their marketing practices in order to successfully reach the MTV Generation that was media and television obsessed. MTV is still successful at achieving customer success and influence with the MTV Generation and with future generations as well. "A quarter century later, the underdog venture known as MTV has expanded to become a branded space for visualized music, reality shows, and lifestyle programming – heavily influencing consumer choices all the while".

== MTV Generation Award ==
In 2005, MTV began honoring prominent actors of the generation with the MTV Generation Award. Honorees include:

Year	Image	Recipient	Nationality	Notes	Ref.
2005		Tom Cruise	United States	Presented by Katie Holmes. Inaugural honoree.	
2006		Jim Carrey	Canada; United States	Presented by Will Ferrell.	
2007		Mike Myers	Canada; United Kingdom; United States	Presented by Cameron Diaz.	
2008		Adam Sandler	United States	Presented by Tom Cruise. First honoree to have award presented by a past honoree.	
2009		Ben Stiller	United States	Presented by Kiefer Sutherland, Triumph the Insult Comic Dog, and Zac Efron.	
2010		Sandra Bullock	United States	Presented by Betty White, Bradley Cooper, and Scarlett Johansson. First woman to receive the honor.	
2011		Reese Witherspoon	United States	Presented by Patrick Dempsey, Robert Pattinson, and Chelsea Handler.	
2012		Johnny Depp	United States	Presented by Joe Perry and Steven Tyler.	
2013		Jamie Foxx	United States	Presented by Kerry Washington. First African American to receive the honor.	
2014		Mark Wahlberg	United States	Presented by Adrian Grenier, Jerry Ferrara, and Kevin Dillon.	
2015		Robert Downey Jr.	United States	Presented by Chris Evans, Scarlett Johansson, Chris Hemsworth, Mark Ruffalo, and Jeremy Renner.	
2016		Will Smith	United States	Presented by Queen Latifah and Halle Berry.	
2017	—N/a	The Fast and the Furious franchise		Presented by Gal Gadot. First film franchise to receive the honor. During the acceptance speech, Vin Diesel paid tribute to the late Paul Walker.	
2018		Chris Pratt	United States	Presented by Bryce Dallas Howard and Aubrey Plaza.	
2019		Dwayne Johnson	United States	Presented by Zachary Levi.	
2020 (Note: The 2020 award ceremony was cancelled due to the COVID-19 pandemic)	—N/a				
2021		Scarlett Johansson	United States	Presented by Billy Porter. Johansson accepted the award by video message. Johansson previously co-presented the award in 2010 and 2015.	
2022		Jennifer Lopez	United States	Presented by Vanessa Hudgens. Lopez was previously the recipient of the Michael Jackson Video Vanguard Award at the 2018 MTV Video Music Awards, becoming the first entertainer to receive both honors from MTV. First ethnic Latin entertainer to receive the honor.	
2023	—N/a				
2024 (Note: The 2024 award ceremony was cancelled due to the network wanting to return with a reimagined format for the ceremony for 2025)	—N/a				

== In popular culture ==
In the 1995 animated film A Goofy Movie, Pete (voiced by Jim Cummings) calls Goofy's time in the spa "taking a break from the MTV Generation" (referring to the latter's 14-year-old son Max).

== See also ==
- Criticism of MTV
- Brand loyalty
- Postmodern television
