= The Goblin Master's Grimoire =

- Cover of The Goblin Master's Grimoire
- Author: Jim C. Hines
- Cover artist: Emily Fiegenschuh
- Language: English
- Genre: Fantasy
- Publisher: ISFiC Press
- Publication date: 2013
- Publication place: United States
- Media type: Print (hardcover)
- Pages: 288 pp
- ISBN: 978-0-9857989-9-4
- OCLC: 881037586

The Goblin Master's Grimoire is a collection of fantasy short stories by Jim C. Hines, first published in hardcover by ISFiC Press in November 2013. An e-book edition followed from the same publisher in October 2014.

== Summary ==
The book contains twenty-two short stories and novelettes by the author, together with an introduction by John Scalzi, a bibliography of the author's works by Hines and Steven H Silver, and an afterword by Seanan McGuire. The majority of the works were originally published between 1999 and 2012 in the anthologies Fantastic Companions, Fantasy Gone Wrong, Gamer Fantastic, A Girl's Guide to Guns and Monsters, If I Were an Evil Overlord, L. Ron Hubbard Presents Writers of the Future Volume XV, Magic in the Mirrorstone, Misspelled (anthology)|Misspelled, The Modern Fae's Guide to Surviving Humanity, Strip Mauled, Sword and Sorceress XXI, Turn the Other Chick, and Zombiesque, and the magazines Andromeda Spaceways Inflight Magazine, Clarkesworld Magazine, Fantasy Magazine, and Realms of Fantasy.

== Contents ==
- "Introduction" (John Scalzi)
- "Goblin Lullaby"
- "The Haunting of Jig's Ear"
- "Goblin Hunter"
- "School Spirit"
- "Deliverance"
- "The Blue Corpse Corps"
- "Twas the Night of Midwinter: A Goblin Christmas"
- "Sister of the Hedge"
- "Corrupted"
- "In the Line of Duty"
- "Heart of Ash"
- "Daddy's Little Girl"
- "Original Gangster"
- "Ours to Fight For"
- "Gift of the Kites"
- "Blade of the Bunny"
- "Spell of the Sparrow"
- "Over the Hill"
- "The Creature in Your Neighborhood"
- "Untrained Melody"
- "Mightier Than the Sword"
- "Kitemaster"
- "A Jim C. Hines Bibliography" (Jim C. Hines and Steven H Silver)
- "Jim Hines: The Wizard We Deserve" (Seanan McGuire)
