= Icon (Iowa science fiction convention) =

Annual science fiction convention in Iowa

ICON
- Status: Active
- Genre: Science fiction
- Location: Iowa City, Iowa
- Country: United States
- Inaugurated: 1975
- Attendance: 400-500
- Organizer: The Mindbridge Foundation
- Website: Iowa ICON home page

ICON is an annual science fiction convention held in the Cedar Rapids/Iowa City area of Iowa since 1975, usually in late October or early November, under the auspices of the Mindbridge Foundation, a not-for-profit foundation also responsible for AnimeIowa and Gamicon. The organization was a branching off of the Science Fiction League of Iowa Students, which was founded by author Joe Haldeman. It is the oldest and largest science fiction convention in Iowa.

== History ==
1 - 1975 October 31-November 2 -SkinnyCon - Iowa City, Iowa

- Roger Zelazny - author guest of honor
- Duck's Breath Mystery Theatre - guest of honor

2 - 1976 November 5–7 -Destructocon - Coralville, Iowa

- Frank Herbert - author guest of honor
- Mike Glicksohn - guest of honor

3 - 1977 October 28–30 - - Coralville, Iowa

- Joe Haldeman - author guest of honor and ICON founder
- Gay Haldeman - guest of honor

4 - 1979 November 9–11 -DisasterCon - Coralville, Iowa

- Gene Wolfe - author guest of honor
- Rusty Hevelin - guest of honor
- Moebius Theatre - guest of honor

5 - 1980 November 7–9 - - Cedar Rapids, Iowa

- Gordon R. Dickson - author guest of honor
- Bob and Anne Passavoy - guest of honor

6 - 1981 October 30-November 1 -first appearance of Trans Iowa Canal Company - Coralville, Iowa

- Phyllis Eisenstein - author guest of honor
- Dave Martin - guest of honor

7 - 1982 November 5–7 - - Coralville, Iowa

- Poul Anderson - author guest of honor
- Gregory Frost - author guest of honor
- Rusty Hevelin - guest of honor
- Mark Moore - guest of honor

8 - 1983 October 21–23 -L-Con - Coralville, Iowa

- C. J. Cherryh - author guest of honor
- Rob Chilson - author guest of honor

9 - 1984 October 26–28 - - Coralville, Iowa

- Dean Ing - author guest of honor
- Robin Bailey - author guest of honor
- Bob Tucker - guest of honor

10 - 1985 October 25–27 -SFLIS Family Reunion - Coralville, Iowa

- George R. R. Martin - author guest of honor
- Joe Haldeman - author guest of honor

11 - 1986 October 24–26 -Habittrail Con - Cedar Rapids, Iowa

- Robert Asprin - author guest of honor
- Phil Foglio - artist guest of honor

12 - 1987 October 16–18 -Money-Grubbing Capitalist Con - Coralville, Iowa

- Glen Cook - author guest of honor
- Dick Spelman - guest of honor

13 - 1989 January 20–22 -Beauty and the Beast Con-within-a-Con - Coralville, Iowa

- Joel Rosenberg - author guest of honor
- Algis Budrys - author guest of honor
- Mickey Zucker Reichert - author guest of honor
- Darlene Coltrain - guest of honor
- Roy Dotrice - media guest of honor

14 - 1989 October 13–15 - - Coralville, Iowa

- Frederik Pohl - author guest of honor
- P. D. Breeding-Black - artist guest of honor
- Lucy Synk - artist guest of honor
- Elizabeth Anne Hull - guest of honor

15 - 1990 September 28–30 - - Coralville, Iowa

- Philip José Farmer - author guest of honor
- Erin McKee - artist guest of honor

16 - 1991 October 12–14 -GinCon aka BlondeCon - Coralville, Iowa

- Steven Brust - author guest of honor
- Bob and Nonie Quinlan - fan guests of honor

17 - 1992 October 7–9 -Escape the Mundane CruiseCon, StressCon - Coralville, Iowa

- Mercedes Lackey - author guest of honor
- Larry Dixon - artist guest of honor
- Rex Bryant - fan guest of honor

18 - 1993 October 8–10 -Pirats of Phenzance, BarneyCon - Coralville, Iowa

- Suzette Haden Elgin - author guest of honor
- Jody Lee - artist guest of honor
- Nancy and Martin McClure - fan guest of honor

19 - 1994 October 14–16 -One Last Teen Fling - Coralville, Iowa

- Gregory Frost - author guest of honor
- Robert Daniels Jr. - artist guest of honor
- Joe Haldeman - guest of honor

20 - 1995 October 6–8 -ICON Goes Platinum - Coralville, Iowa

- Steven Barnes - author guest of honor
- Phil Hester - author/artist guest of honor
- Myrna Logan - fan guest of honor

21 - 1996 October 11–13 -ICON Comes of Age - Coralville, Iowa

- Emma Bull - author guest of honor
- Will Shetterly - author guest of honor
- Tadao Tomomatsu - fan guest of honor

22 - 1997 October 10–12 -Catch 22 - Coralville, Iowa

- John M. Ford - author guest of honor
- Kaja Foglio - artist guest of honor
- William "Bear" Reed - fan guest of honor

23 - 1998 October 16–18 -"Working Today For A Better Tomorrow, Fnord" - Coralville, Iowa

- Charles de Lint - author guest of honor
- Forrest Ackerman - author guest of honor
- Ed Heil - artist guest of honor

24 - 1999 October 29–31 -efiL fO gninaeM ehT, The Return of HabitrailCon, Seat of Our Pants Con - Cedar Rapids, Iowa

- Peter Beagle - author guest of honor
- Bill Johnson - guest of honor
- Charles Piehl - guest of honor
- Tyler Walpole - artist guest of honor

25 - 2000 October 13–15 -Prodigal Son - Coralville, Iowa

- Harry Turtledove - author guest of honor
- "Orange Mike" Lowrey - fan guest of honor

26 - 2001 October 12–14 -Hey, nice hotel! - Cedar Rapids, Iowa

- L. E. Modesitt, Jr. - author guest of honor
- Denise Garner - artist guest of honor
- Dennis Lynch - fan guest of honor

27 - 2002 October 18–20 -Carrot Juice - Cedar Rapids, Iowa

- Jennifer Roberson - author guest of honor
- John Garner - artist guest of honor
- Les & Jeannette Roth - fan guests of honor

28 - 2003 October 10–12 -Cheesy Poofs - Cedar Rapids, Iowa

- David Drake - author guest of honor
- Lee Seed - artist guest of honor
- Gregg Parmentier - fan guest of honor

29 - 2004 October 8–10 - - Cedar Rapids, Iowa

- Joe Haldeman - author guest of honor
- Beth Hansen - artist guest of honor
- Gay Haldeman - guest of honor
- Rusty Hevelin - toastmaster

30 - 2005 October 28–30 - - Cedar Rapids, Iowa

- Sarah Zettel - author guest of honor
- Jael - artist guest of honor
- Arlene Martel - media guest of honor

31 - 2006 October 13–15 -Gallium: The Other Soft Metal - Cedar Rapids, Iowa

- C. S. Friedman - author guest of honor
- Larry Price - artist guest of honor

32 - 2007 November 2–4 -Rise of the Phoenix - Coralville, Iowa

- Jack McDevitt - author guest of honor
- Ralph J. Ryan - artist guest of honor
- Rusty Hevelin - toastmaster

33 - 2008 October 31-November 2 -Horror/Halloween - Coralville, Iowa

- Tanya Huff - author guest of honor
- Alan M. Clark - artist guest of honor
- Richard Klemensen - guest of honor
- Rusty Hevelin - toastmaster

34 - 2009 October 23–25 -Adventures in the Secret Kingdom of Fandom - Cedar Rapids, Iowa

- Jim C. Hines - author guest of honor
- Heather Bruton - artist guest of honor
- Rusty Hevelin - toastmaster

35 - 2010 November 5–7 -A Steam-Powered Convention of the Future - Cedar Rapids, Iowa

- Cory Doctorow - author guest of honor
- Daniel Dociu - artist guest of honor
- Susan Leabhart - guest of honor
- Rusty Hevelin - toastmaster

36 - 2011 October 28–30 -Genre Fusion: When Worlds Collide - Cedar Rapids, Iowa

- Jane Yolen - author guest of honor
- Steve Thomas - artist guest of honor
- Rusty Hevelin (in absentia), Denny Lynch - toastmaster

37 - 2012 November 2–4 -The Convention at the End of the Universe - Cedar Rapids, Iowa

- Steven Erikson - author guest of honor
- Mike Cole - artist guest of honor
- Jim C. Hines - co-toastmaster and author
- Dennis Lynch - co-toastmaster

38 - 2013 November 15–17 -Recalling 1013 - The Year When Nothing Happened - Cedar Rapids, Iowa

- Nancy Kress - author guest of honor
- Ellen Datlow - editor guest of honor
- Jack Skillingstead - writer guest of honor
- Joe Haldeman - author/artist guest of honor and ICON founder
- Gay Haldeman - editor and Mommy of ICON guest of honor
- Gregory Frost - author and Co-Founder of ICON
- Jim C. Hines - Toastmaster and author
- Steven Keith Tait - fan guest of honor

39 - 2014 October 31 - November 2 -League of Extraordinary Gentlefen - Cedar Rapids, Iowa

- Elizabeth Bear - author guest of honor
- Scott Lynch - editor guest of honor
- Lar deSouza - artist guest of honor
- Megan Lara - artist guest of honor
- Jim C. Hines - Toastmaster and author

40 - 2015 October 16–18 -Con of Futures Past - Cedar Rapids, Iowa

- David Gerrold - author guest of honor
- Sarah Clemens - artist guest of honor
- Ann Leckie - author guest of honor
- Kalli McCandless - fan guest of honor
- Jim C. Hines - Toastmaster and author
- Joe Haldeman - author and ICON founder
- Gay Haldeman - editor and Mommy of ICON

41 - 2016 October 28–30 -Back to the ICON - Cedar Rapids, Iowa

- Seanan McGuire - author guest of honor
- Arden Ellen Nixon - artist guest of honor
- Laura J. Mixon - special guest of honor
- Steven Gould - special guest of honor
- Inger Myers - fan guest of honor
- Jim C. Hines - Toastmaster and author

42 - 2017 September 29 - October 1, 2017 - Hitchhikers Guide to ICON42 - Cedar Rapids, Iowa

- Wesley Chu - author guest of honor
- H. Russ Brown - artist guest of honor
- Sheril Harper - fan guest of honor
- Jim C. Hines - Toastmaster and author
- Joe Haldeman - author and ICON founder
- Gay Haldeman - editor and Mommy of ICON

43 - 2018 October 5–7, 2018 - Eruption! - Cedar Rapids, Iowa

- Mike Mullin - author guest of honor
- Daniel Mohr - artist guest of honor
- Mike Miller - fan guest of honor
- Wolfie B. Bad - actor guest of honor
- Jim C. Hines - Toastmaster and author
- Joe Haldeman - author and ICON founder
- Gay Haldeman - editor and Mommy of ICON

44 - 2019 November 1–3, 2019 - Unpacking Non-Binary Reality - Cedar Rapids, Iowa

- Pat Murphy - author guest of honor
- Shawn Palek - Artist guest of honor
- Misty Palek - Artist guest of honor
- Kat Pepmiller - costumer/cosplay artist guest of honor
- Mystie Hollaman - fan guest of honor
- Jim C. Hines - Toastmaster and author

45 - 2020 October 9–10, 2020 - V-ICON: The Year ICON Went Virtual - Online only

- Joe Haldeman - author and founder of ICON
- Gay Haldeman - editor and founder of ICON
- Catrina Taylor - author
- Alex Penland - author
- Erin Casey - author
- Tambo Jones - author
- Beth Hudson - author

46 - 2021 October 15–17, 2021 - Seeking Further Horizons - Cedar Rapids, Iowa

- Eric Flint - Author Guest of Honor
- Jeff Lee Johnson - Artist Guest of Honor
- Jim C. Hines - Toastmaster and author
- Joe Haldeman - author and founder of ICON
- Gay Haldeman - editor and founder of ICON
- Beth Hudson - fan guest of honor
- Cheshire Moon - Music guest of honor

47 - 2022 October 14–16, 2022 - The Prime Universe - Celebrating How Alternate Universes Intersect With Ours - Cedar Rapids, Iowa

- Nicholas Meyer, author
- Mitch Bentley, artist
- Steve & Jenny Todd, fans
- Jim C. Hines - Toastmaster and author

48 - 2023 October 13-15 - We only work in outer space! - Cedar Rapids, Iowa

- Lynne M. Thomas
- Michael Damian Thomas
- Chelsea Eldeen
- Jim C. Hines - Toastmaster and author
- Joe Haldeman - author and founder of ICON
- Gay Haldeman - editor and founder of ICON

49 - 2024 October 18-20 - New Horizons - Cedar Rapids, Iowa

- Megan Mackie - author
- Clara Meath - artist
- Zach Howard - artist
- Jim C. Hines - Toastmaster and author

49.5 - 2025 October 10-11 - The Half Season - Iowa City, Iowa, one day and planning for 50 in 2026

- Darby Harn
- Gay Haldeman
- Joe Haldeman

50 - 2026 October 24 - Celebrate 50 years of ICON - Coralville, Iowa

- ConCom: Tricia Andersen, Brian Anderson, Pamela Webster
