= Slayers of Old =

2025 novel by Jim C. Hines

- First edition cover
- Author: Jim C. Hines
- Cover artist: Colleen Reinhart
- Language: English
- Genre: Fantasy
- Published: 2025
- Publication place: United States
- Media type: Print
- Pages: 341 p (Hardcover first edition)
- ISBN: 9780756419684
- OCLC: 1492467752

Slayers of Old is a 2025 fantasy novel by Jim C. Hines. The story follows a trio of retired magic users who run a bookshop as they try to stop an apocalypse. It received positive reviews from critics.

== Plot ==
Jenny Winter, Annette Thorne, and Temple Finn are retired heroes who run a bookshop in Salem, Massachusetts. Jenny, a former Hunter of Artemis, saves a stabbed magical being who comes to her for help under strange circumstances. She asks Annette, a half-succubus private investigator, to look into who might have done it. Annette is trying to repair her strained relationship with her son, Blake, and his children, Morgan and Ava. A young man, Ronnie, comes into the bookshop and Annette suspects him of being the culprit in the stabbing and decides to track him. Temple, a 99-year-old sorcerer, shares a magical connection with his family home, which houses the bookshop. When Morgan and Ava discover the house is starting to decay, he worries his old age is affecting the house's magic.

Temple searches for Ronnie, but finds him magically shielded. Jenny asks Artemis for help locating him, which also fails. Annette goes to a local pub owned by a magician named Marmaduke Stone to ask for help locating Ronnie, and is attacked by three teenagers with holy water as she leaves, burning her badly. Jenny goes out to search for Ronnie without magic, and finds him in a magical van watching the bookshop. He escapes, but they are able to use the van to trace his location to a local hotel. The van is possessed by the spirit of Ronnie's dead mother, and she agrees to help them if they don't harm Ronnie. Jenny and Annette break into the hotel and bring Ronnie back to the bookshop. Ronnie tells them he is descended from a long line of monster hunters, and has come to Salem to prevent them from bringing about an apocalypse he saw in a prophetic dream.

Ava asks Annette for help tracking down her missing friend Sage. While Jenny trains Ronnie in combat, Annette goes to Sage's house and finds a summoning circle in his room, along with magical pills that contain some sort of dark force. Temple examines the pills and discovers they hold pieces of shoggoths, extradimensional beings covered in eyes. Jenny suspects the person distributing these pills is a friend from her youth, Alex Barclay. They discover Alex has been posing as a chemistry teacher at the high school, and that Morgan is involved in his plans. Morgan admits that Sage got the pills from him, and that Alex has been making children at the school do rituals to try and summon the god R'gngyk. Sage tries to burn down the bookshop, but is stopped by Temple's magic. Sage and Morgan fall sick, having begun growing eyes on their bodies. Annette goes to kill Alex, but he beats her and escapes. Alex destroys the local pub as a diversion while he breaks into the bookshop and begins summoning R'gngyk through a portal. Jenny reconnects with Artemis and uses her power to disable Alex, then works with Annette to close the portal and save the children Alex was using. The effort of protecting the bookshop kills Temple, who remains as a ghost.

A year later, Jenny, Annette, and Ronnie still run the bookshop and help magical creatures in need, while caring for a comatose Alex.

== Publication ==
Slayers of Old was published as both a hardcover and e-book in 2025 by DAW Books.

== Reception ==
Slayers of Old received positive reviews from critics. Kristi Chadwick of Library Journal called it "a delightful, somewhat cozy fantasy with a fast pace and snappy supporting characters" and said the alternating points of view developed the characters. Becky Spratford of Booklist also praised the characters, saying they will "fill readers hearts". A review in Publishers Weekly called it irreverent and "vividly imagined".
