= Ikon =

Ikon is an alternative spelling of icon, and the normal spelling in German and many other languages.

Ikon or iKON may also refer to:

== Arts, entertainment, and media ==
=== Music ===
- iKon, a South Korean hip hop group
- Ikon (Australian band), an Australian dark wave group
- Ikon (record label), a Russian record label
- Ikon Asean, a singing competition between Indonesia, Malaysia, and the Philippines
- Ikons, a box set featuring material recorded by the American hard rock band Kiss
- The Ikons, an early name of the Canadian band 13 Engines
- "The Ikon", instrumental suite in Todd Rundgren's Utopia
- Ikon the Verbal Hologram, former stage name of rapper Vinnie Paz

=== Other media ===
- Ikon, a 1982 novel by Graham Masterton
- Ikon FCL, the video sublabel of Factory Records
- Interkerkelijke Omroep Nederland, abbreviated as IKON, a Dutch public broadcaster

== Brands and enterprises ==
- Ford Ikon, a sedan version of the Ford Fiesta automobile
- Ikon Gallery, or "The Ikon", a modern art gallery in Birmingham, England
- IKON Office Solutions, a document management company
- IKON Pass, a multi ski resort season pass sold by Alterra Mountain Company
- Zeiss Ikon, a German optics company

== See also ==
- Icon (disambiguation)
