= Gamicon =

Gaming convention in East Central, Iowa

Coordinates: 41°40′54.5″N 91°33′30.9″W

- Status: Active
- Venue: Hyatt Regency Coralville Hotel & Conference Center
- Location: Coralville, Iowa
- Country: United States
- Inaugurated: 1991
- Attendance: 797
- Organizer: Mindbridge Foundation
- Website: https://www.gamicon.org

Gamicon is Iowa's longest-running non-gambling game convention in the Cedar Rapids, Iowa, Iowa City, Iowa, and surrounding area. Gamicon alpha was sponsored by the Science Fiction League of Iowa Students (SFLIS). Gamicon later incorporated as a not-for-profit organization, and then merged with the Mindbridge Foundation. Each Gamicon was numbered using the Greek alphabet until Gamicon Omega. After that, the conventions were named according to their number on the Periodic Table.

Gamicon Bromine will be held on March 6 - 8, 2026, at the Hyatt Regency Coralville Hotel & Conference Center in Coralville, Iowa.

Gamicon features board games, card games, role-playing games, miniature games, and computer and video games Gamicon's attendance averages 500-600 attendees, and is the longest running gaming convention in Iowa.

It is supported by the Mindbridge Foundation, which also supports Icon and AnimeIowa.

== History ==
Greek Alphabet Named Conventions
Name	Date	Guests
Alpha	1991	Roger Moore of Dragon Magazine
Beta	1992	Zeb Cook of TSR and Helen Cook
Gamma	1993	Erick Wujcik of Amber RPG
Delta	1994	Jonathan Tweet, RPG Designer
Epsilon	1995	Cathy Klessig of Phage Press
Zeta	1996	Richard Tucholka of Tri Tac Systems & Cathy Klessig of Phage Press
Eta	1997	Aaron Allston & Lester Smith
Theta	1998	James Ernest of Cheapass Games
Iota	1999	John Blaska, Dragon Epic
Kappa	2000	Chris Clark of Inner City Games Designs
Lambda	2001	Jonathan Tweet, RPG Designer
Mu	2003	Jolly Blackburn of Kenzer & Co.
Nu	2004	Shane Hensley of Deadlands
Xi	2005	Robert J. Schwalb of Green Ronin Publishing
Omicron	2006	Matt Snyder, Chimera Creative
Pi	2007	Luke Reed, Jerry Shomberg, Fantasy Flight Games
Rho	2008	Fantasy Flight Games
Sigma	2009	Brian Wood & Jeff Brawley, Hyperion Games
Tau	2010	King Zombie. Tyler Walpole, Illustrator
Upsilon	2011	Tyler Walpole, Illustrator
Phi	2012	Jay Tummelson of Rio Grande Games. Tyler Walpole, Illustrator
Chi	2013	Clinton Boomer, RPG Writer. Tyler Walpole, Illustrator
Psi	2014	Chris O'Neill & Dan Landis of Kobolds Ate My Baby! Tyler Walpole, Illustrator
Omega	2015	Dan Proctor of Goblinoid Games. Tyler Walpole, Illustrator

At which point we ran out of alphabet and moved to the Periodic table of the elements...

Periodic Table Named Events
Name	Date	Venue	Atten.	Guests
Manganese	2016			Curt Covert of Smirk & Dagger Games. Tina Bongorno, Illustrator and Artist.
Iron	2017			Ken Hite, Game Designer & Podcaster. Steven Groom, Miniatures Artist
Cobalt	2018			Kane Klenko of Renegade Games. Aaron Riley, Artist
Nickel	2019	Cedar Rapids Marriott		Stephen Buonocore, President of Stronghold Games. Terry Pavlet, Board Game Artist
Copper	2020	Cedar Rapids Marriott		Clair Hoffman, D&D Adventurers League. Steven Groom, Miniatures Artist.
Zinc	2021	VIRTUAL due to Covid		
Gallium	2022	Cedar Rapids Marriott		Jon Lonngren of Fallen Dominion Studios
Germanium	Feb. 24 - 26, 2023	Cedar Rapids Marriott		Dexter Dakota of Barely Suitable Games
Arsenic	Feb. 23 - 25, 2024	Radisson Hotel Cedar Rapids		Nat Barmore, Co-Creator of Dread.
Selenium	Feb. 28 - Mar. 2, 2025	Hyatt Regency Coralville Hotel & Conference Center	797	Scott Brady, Game Designer of Boop
Bromine	Mar. 6 - 8, 2026	Hyatt Regency Coralville Hotel & Conference Center	tbd	Kroze Kersky, Professional game enthusiast and Director
