= Heroes in Training =

Anthology of fantasy stories

- Cover of Heroes in Training
- Editors: Martin H. Greenberg; Jim C. Hines
- Language: English
- Genre: Fantasy short stories
- Publisher: DAW Books
- Publication date: 2007
- Publication place: United States
- Media type: Print (Paperback)
- Pages: viii, 311 pp.
- ISBN: 978-0-7564-0438-3
- OCLC: 144228432
- Dewey Decimal: 813.0876608 222
- LC Class: PS648.F3 H463 2007

Heroes in Training is an anthology of fantasy stories, edited by Martin H. Greenberg and Jim C. Hines. It was first published in paperback by DAW Books in September 2007.

The book collects thirteen short stories and novelettes by various fantasy authors, with an introduction by Hines. It "follows the transformation of ordinary people into extraordinary heroes, including a shape-shifter who is forced unexpectedly into her first solo mission."

== Contents ==
- Introduction (Jim C. Hines)
- "Roomies" (Esther Friesner)
- "Three Names of the Hidden God" (Vera Nazarian)
- "The Princess, the Page, and the Master Cook's Son" (Sherwood Smith)
- "The Children's Crusade" (Robin Wayne Bailey)
- "The Apprentice" (Catherine H. Shaffer)
- "Beneath the Skin" (James Lowder)
- "Giantkiller" (G. Scott Huggins)
- "Drinker" (Michael Jasper)
- "King Harrowhelm" (Ed Greenwood)
- "Honor is a Game Mortals Play" (Eugie Foster)
- "The Wizard's Legacy" (Michael A. Burstein)
- "A Touch of Blue: a Web Shifters Story" (Julie Czerneda)
- "Sir Apropos of Nothing and The Adventure of the Receding Heir" (Peter David)
- "About the Authors"
