= Cassandra Hodges =

American voice actress

- Born: January 3, 1983; Dallas, Texas, U.S.
- Died: June 27, 2011 (aged 28); Lewisville Lake, Texas, U.S.
- Occupation: Voice actress

Cassandra Hodges (January 3, 1983 – June 27, 2011) was an American voice actress. She was best known for providing numerous dubbed voices, in the English version of the Japanese anime television series School Rumble.

In addition to her work in School Rumble, she provided the dubbed English versions of Gotanda and Yuki in Hell Girl and Camembert in Glass Fleet, and dubbed numerous characters in the English versions of One Piece, Black Butler, Baka and Test, xxxHolic, Strike Witches, Heaven's Lost Property, Sekirei, Hetalia: Axis Powers, Mushishi, Princess Jellyfish, Solty Rei and Fullmetal Alchemist: Brotherhood.

Hodges died on June 27, 2011, in Lewisville Lake, Texas, at the age of 28.
