= Star of the Seas =

Royal Caribbean International cruise ship

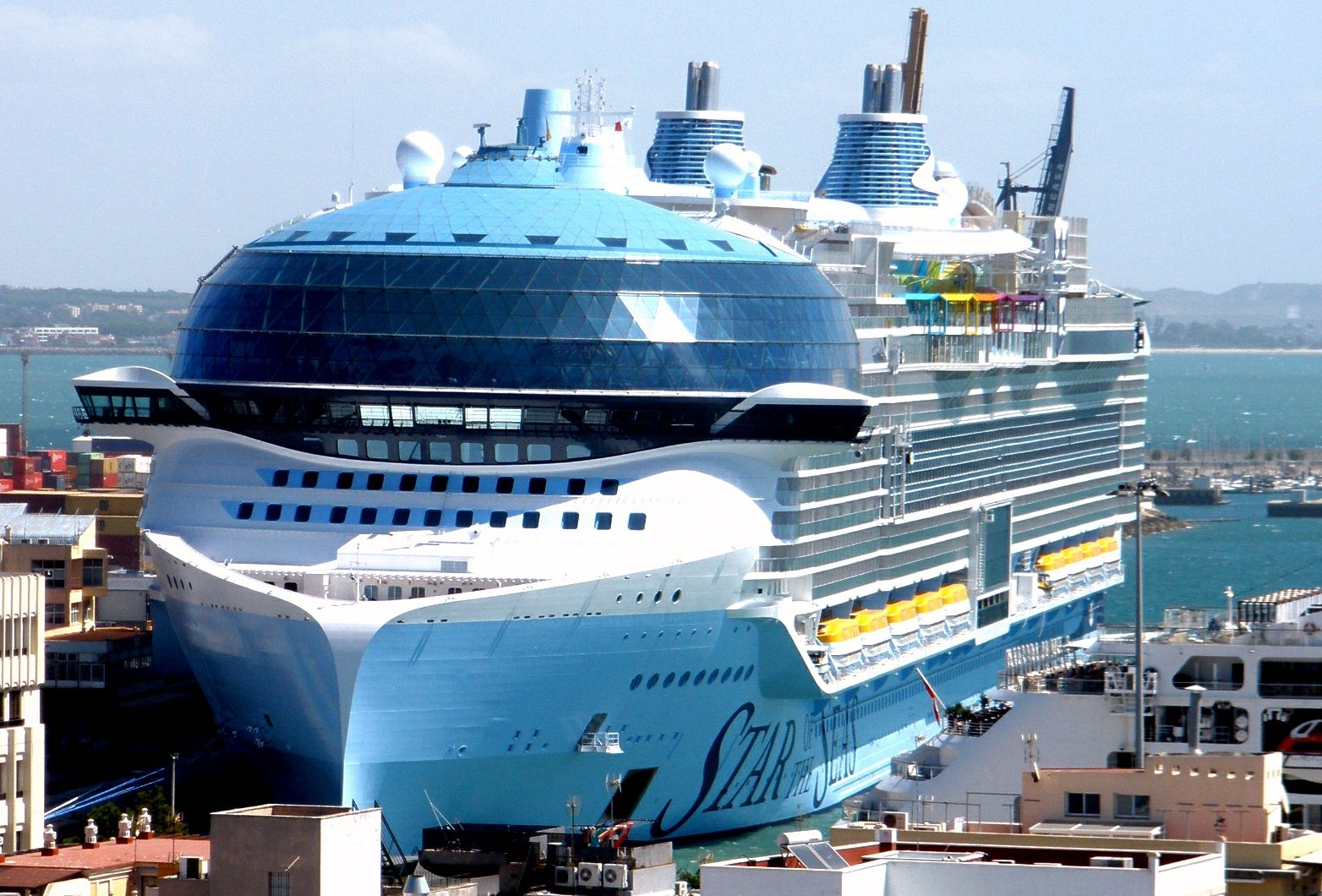
- Star of the Seas in Cádiz on 25 July 2025

History
- Owner: Royal Caribbean Group
- Operator: Royal Caribbean International
- Port of registry: Nassau, Bahamas
- Builder: Meyer Turku, Finland
- Cost: €2.12 billion
- Yard number: NB 1401
- Laid down: 15 December 2023
- Launched: 24 September 2024
- Christened: 20 August 2025
- Acquired: 10 July 2025
- In service: 16 August 2025
- Identification: Call sign: C6HS3; IMO number: 9829942; MMSI number: 311001551; DNV ID: 38566
- Status: In service

General characteristics
- Class & type: Icon-class cruise ship
- Type: Cruise ship
- Tonnage: 248,663 GT, 307,895 NT
- Length: 364.83 metres (1,196.9 ft)
- Beam: 48.48 m (159.1 ft)
- Draught: 9.4 metres (31 ft)
- Decks: 20
- Installed power: 3 × Wärtsilä 14V46DF, 16,030 kW (21,790 hp) each; 3 × Wärtsilä 12V46DF, 13,740 kW (18,680 hp) each
- Propulsion: Diesel-electric; 3 × 20 MW (27,000 hp) ABB Azipod, all azimuthing; 5 × 4.8 MW (6,400 hp) Wärtsilä WTT-45 CP bow thrusters
- Capacity: 5,610 passengers (double occupancy); 7,600 passengers (maximum capacity)
- Crew: 2,350

Star of the Seas is a cruise ship operated by Royal Caribbean International and is the second Icon-class cruise ship, the first being Icon of the Seas. She was built by Meyer Turku in Finland. The ship entered service in August 2025. At 248,663 gross tonnage (GT), Star of the Seas shares the title of the largest cruise ship in the world with her sister ships.

== History ==
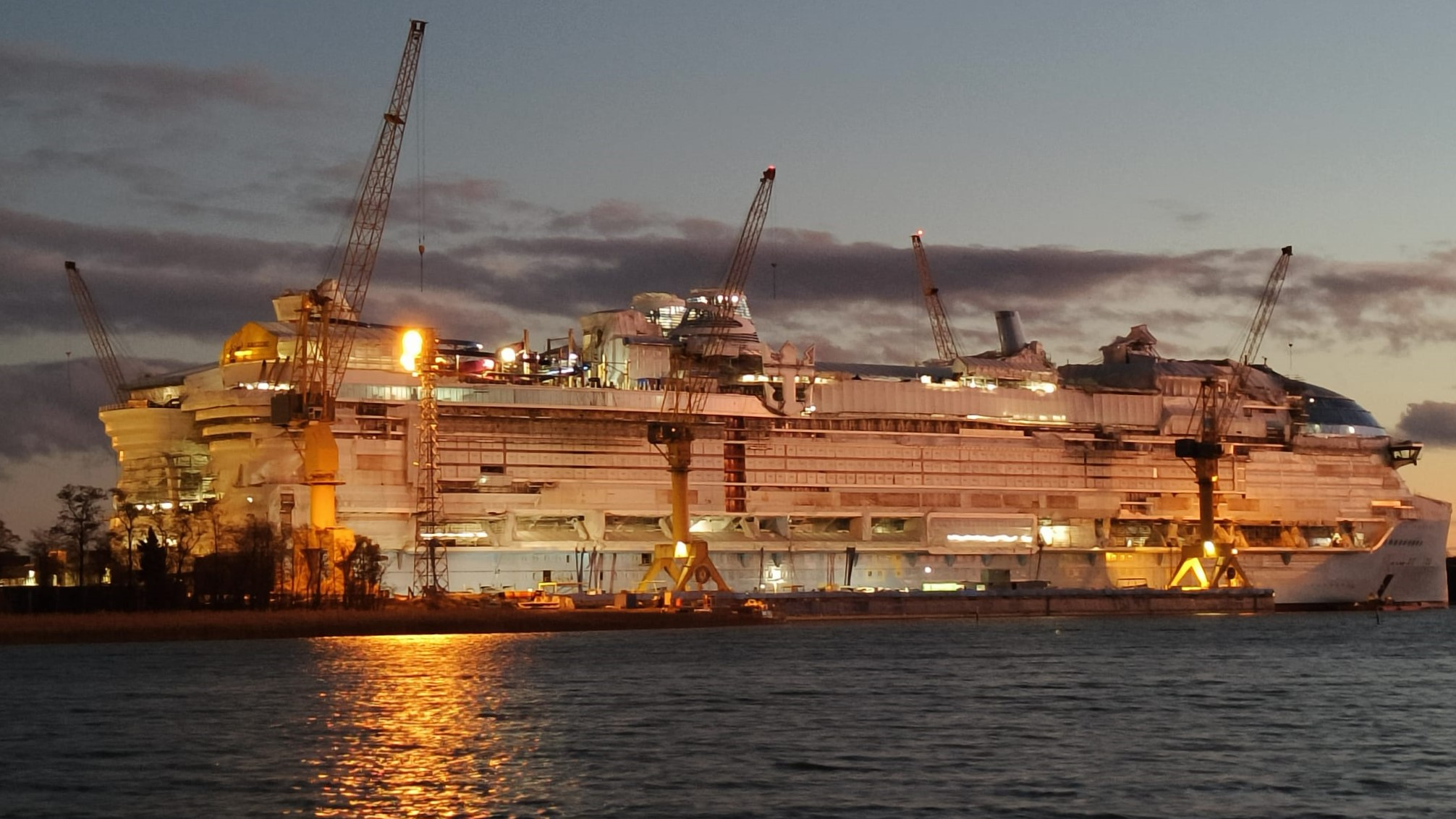
Star of the Seas under construction at Meyer Shipyard in Turku, Finland

Steel-cutting for the ship began on 15 February 2023, the name was announced on 5 October 2023, the keel was laid on 15 December 2023, and the ship was floated out on 25 September 2024. The sea trials took place in spring 2025 and the ship was delivered in July. Service started on 16 August 2025. She sails out of Port Canaveral in the United States.

== Design ==
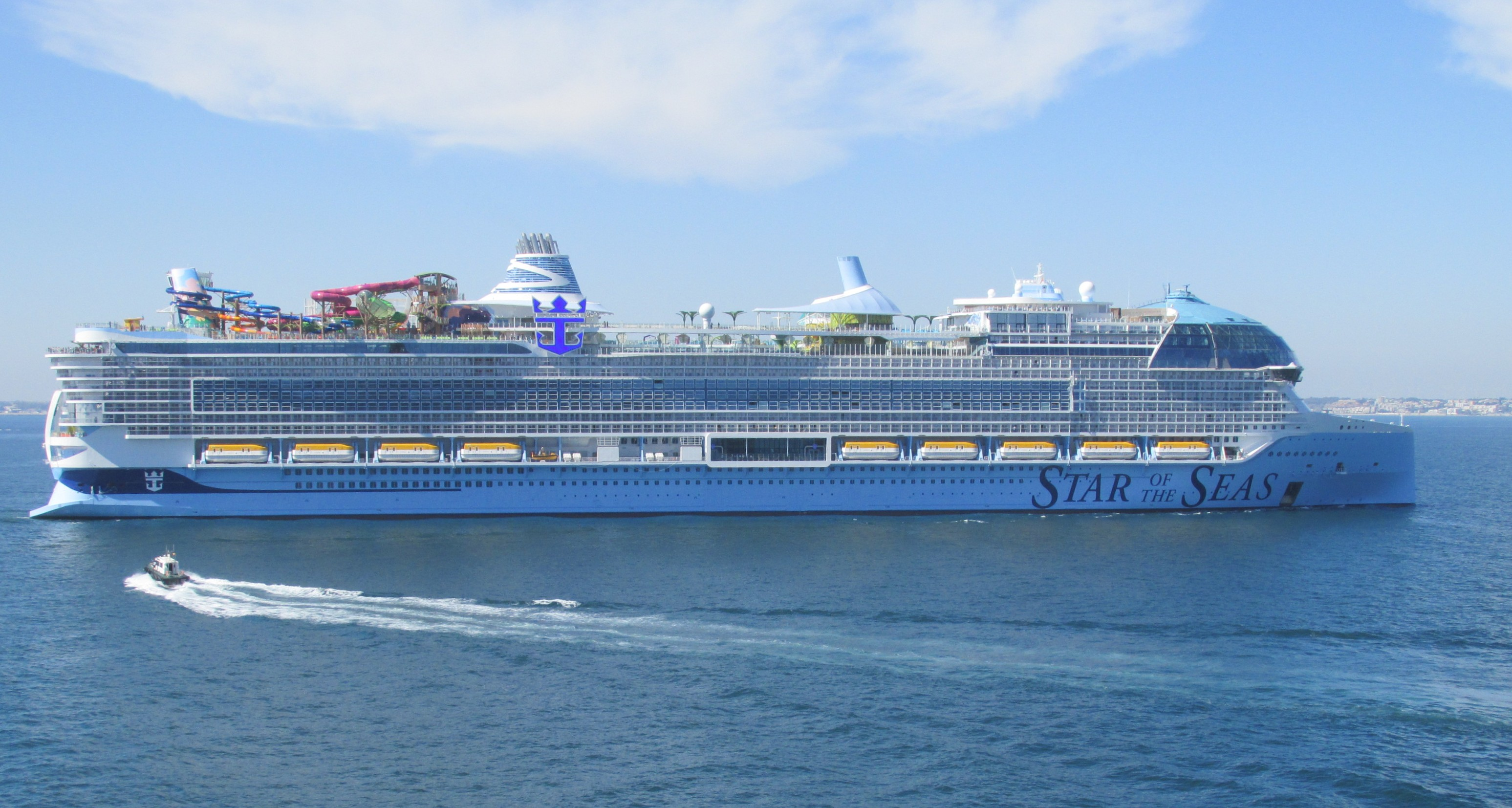
Star of the Seas in Cádiz, Spain, in July 2025. The waterslides of Thrill Island are visible atop at the stern, the fake trees of Chill Island amidships, and the glass AquaDome forward.

Star of the Seas has a gross tonnage of 248,663 and a capacity for 5,610 passengers at double occupancy (over 7000 at full capacity). She shares the title of the largest cruise ship in the world with her sister ship.

The ship features seven pools and six waterslides, as well as over 40 restaurants and bars spread over its 20 decks. It is split into 8 "neighborhoods": the Royal Promenade hallway that runs down the interior of the ship, the outdoor Central Park courtyard, the Chill Island pool deck, the Thrill Island waterpark, the AquaDome observation area, the family-oriented Surfside outdoor courtyard, the adult-only Hideaway pool deck, and an area dedicated to those staying in a suite. Entertainment onboard includes an adaptation of Back to the Future: The Musical in the Royal Theater, the "Sol" ice-skating show in the Absolute Zero ice arena, and the contemporary circus "Torque" in the AquaTheater.

The ship is powered by six dual-fuel generators, which can run on liquified natural gas. Electricity from these generators powers the ship's three 20-megawatt (27,000 hp) Azipod azimuth thrusters and five bow thrusters.

== See also ==
- Icon of the Seas
