= Libriomancer =

2012 novel by Jim C. Hines

- The first edition cover
- Author: Jim C. Hines
- Cover artist: Gene Mollica; Denise Leigh
- Language: English
- Series: Magic ex Libris
- Genre: Fantasy
- Published: 2012
- Publisher: DAW Books
- Publication place: United States
- Media type: Print (hardcover)
- Pages: 308
- ISBN: 0-7564073-9-7
- OCLC: 800083152
- Followed by: Codex Born

Libriomancer is a fantasy novel by Jim C. Hines. It was first published in 2012 by DAW Books and is the first novel in the Magic ex Libris series. The story follows Isaac Vainio, a libriomancer who can pull objects out of books, as he tries to prevent a magical war between humans and vampires. It began as a short story featuring Smudge, a character from Hines's previous Goblin Quest series. A key theme of the novel is the power of literature and knowledge. It received positive reviews, and reached number 4 on the Locus Bestsellers list.

== Plot ==
Isaac Vainio is a libriomancer, a magic user with the ability to pull objects out of books. He works for The Porters, an organization founded by Johannes Gutenberg dedicated to keeping magic secret from the world. A former field agent, he was restricted to research after a mission went wrong and now works in a small library in Michigan's Upper Peninsula. When vampires attack the library, he is rescued by Lena Greenwood, a dryad. Lena tells him vampires have declared war on the Porters and have captured Dr. Nidhi Shah, who works for the Porters as a therapist. Isaac and Lena are visited by Deb DeGeorge, a Porter who tells them Gutenberg has disappeared, and they realize she has been turned into a vampire when she attacks them.

Isaac and Lena, along with Isaac's pet fire-spider Smudge (a creature Isaac pulled out of a book), set out to discover more about Gutenberg's disappearance and try and prevent a war with the vampires. They are visited briefly by Ponce de Leon, from whom Isaac stole the magical car he is driving. Lena reveals to Isaac that she is not a natural-born dryad, but was brought to Earth from a book. She tells him that, because of her magical origins, her appearance and interests change with the preferences of her current lover and that she has been romantically involved with Dr. Shah. Under the assumption that Shah is dead, she expresses interest in entering a relationship with Isaac. After investigating a recent attack on the Michigan State University library, they go to Detroit to confront the leader of the vampires. While there, they discover Dr. Shah is alive, as is Johannes Gutenberg, though Shah believes he is possessed by a malevolent force.

Isaac uses magic to try and determine the location of Gutenberg, and Isaac starts to show signs of being magically possessed. He inadvertently summons a creature through a book, which he defeats but passes out from overuse of magic. When he wakes up, he finds Lena has brought them to Nicola Pallas, a Regional Master of the Porters and Isaac's superior. She interrogates them about their investigation, leading to Isaac's resignation from the Porters. After leaving with Lena, they uncover the identity of the actor behind Gutenberg's disappearance, Charles Hubert, a man who has been possessed by the souls of literary characters. They are confronted by one of Gutenberg's magical automatons, constructs who act as enforcers for the Porters but have gone rogue since Gutenberg's disappearance and discover the automatons are trapped souls of Gutenberg's enemies. Using the automaton, Isaac is able to locate Gutenberg and Hubert and uses his abilities to take control of one of the automatons and defeat Hubert.

Isaac sees something evil in Hubert, which Gutenberg admits he does not know the origin of. Gutenberg reinstates Isaac into the Porters and diffuses the threat of war with the vampires. Isaac, Lena, and Shah agree to enter into a polyamorous relationship to allow Lena greater freedom in her life, given the nature of her creation.

== Themes ==
Libriomancer has themes of access to literature and knowledge as power, and uses the metaphor of libraries as armories. K.G. McAbee says Libriomancer shows Hines' "love of sheer and unadulterated storytelling".

== Development history ==
Hines was encouraged by an editor to feature Smudge, a character from the Goblin Quest series, in a short story set in present day, which became the basis for Libriomancer. The final story differs from the short story, but Smudge remains a major character in the novel. The protagonist, Isaac, was in part designed to "play with the urban fantasy trope of the love triangle".

=== Publication ===
Libriomancer was published as a hardback novel in 2012 by DAW Books. It has been translated into French.

== Reception ==
Libriomancer was number 4 on the Locus Bestsellers list in November 2012.

It has been well-received by critics. Susan Hempe of VOYA commented positively on the "numerous literary and historical references" present throughout the novel, as well as complimenting the "cast of smart and witty characters". A review in Publishers Weekly also praised the characters, calling them "vivid and multidimensional". Regina Schroeder of Booklist called the story entertaining and said the fact that it is first in a series was "something to look forward to".
