= Icon Aircraft =

American aircraft manufacturer

Icon Aircraft, Inc.
- Logo since 2015
- Type: Private
- Industry: Aviation
- Founded: 2006; in Los Angeles, California, United States
- Founders: Kirk Hawkins; Steen Strand
- Headquarters: Vacaville, California, United States
- Key people: Jerry Meyer (interim CEO from 2022); Jason Huang (President from 2020); Thomas Wieners (President and COO from 2018–2020); Kirk Hawkins (CEO from 2006–2018); Rich Bridge (Vice President of Finance); Mike Farley (Vice President of Global Sales)
- Products: Light-sport aircraft
- Owner: SG Investment America; (2024–present)
- Number of employees: 200+ (2018)
- Website: www.iconaircraft.com

Icon Aircraft, Inc. is a privately held aircraft manufacturing company headquartered in Vacaville, California, USA.

== Overview ==
The company was founded in 2006 by two Stanford graduates, aviator Kirk Hawkins and product designer Steen Strand, to develop and certify the Icon A5 amphibious light sport aircraft (LSA). The aircraft entered production in 2016.

Icon is known for having brought significant excitement and publicity to the LSA industry since the A5's debut in 2008, although legal, financial and developmental issues, as well as a string of early accidents, have slowed company production and growth since 2016.

In April 2024, it filed for Chapter 11 bankruptcy. Later, on August 2, the firm announced that it had completed the sale of its assets to SG Investment America, which would create a new entity to manage the acquired assets.

== History ==
Icon Aircraft was founded in response to the 2004 Federal Aviation Administration establishment of the light-sport aircraft (LSA) class of aircraft and Sport Pilot certificate class of pilot. Kirk Hawkins and Steen Strand founded the company in 2006. Hawkins had previously flown F-16s in the United States Air Force and Boeing 757s for American Airlines. Strand's background is in product design, marketing, and finance, and he founded Freebord, a skateboard company. The two met at Stanford University in a Product Design class in 1993.

A proof of concept aircraft was built in 2007–2008, and made its first flight in July 2008. The company publicly launched the A5 in Los Angeles at a private event on June 11, 2008. Icon has also acknowledged the possibility of releasing additional models in the future, but maintains that it will focus on the light-sport aircraft market.

From 2008 to 2014, the proof of concept aircraft flew more than 700 development flights, and the construction of the first production aircraft began in early 2014. It made its first flight in July 2014 and the company announced that the first customer deliveries were expected in May 2015.

Icon Aircraft has completed four rounds of equity financing. It completed its A round in June 2006 and its B round in July 2008. A million C round was closed in June 2011 and a million D round was announced in June 2013.

In May 2016, the company announced that only 20 aircraft would be completed in 2016, instead of the previously planned 175 and that all these would go to training centers. Customer deliveries were announced as being delayed until 2017 at the earliest, due to the need to improve the manufacturing processes to build the aircraft design. The company also announced that, as a result of issues involving starting production, it would lay off 60 employees and terminate 90 contractors, leaving 160 employees at work. The CEO indicated that the company has the investors and funding required to continue operations through this period, before production is increased and the company can become profitable.

In May 2017, a factory-owned Icon A5 crashed on the shore of Lake Berryessa in Napa County, California, near the company's training facility. Killed in the accident were two Icon employees: lead engineer and chief company test pilot Jon Karkow, who was the pilot in command; and Cagri Sever, Icon's director of engineering, who was a passenger on the flight. Karkow had been involved in the design of the A5's folding wings as well as parts of the aircraft's control systems. The National Transportation Safety Board determined that the cause was "the pilot's failure to maintain clearance from terrain while maneuvering at a low altitude." The board found no fault with the aircraft.

Hawkins resigned as CEO in November 2018. He stayed on at the company in an undefined role and President and COO Thomas Wiener headed the company on an interim basis until July 2020, when Jason Huang was named president.

Due to the China–United States trade war, Chinese investment needed by the company was cut in August 2019. This necessitated laying off 40% of the company workforce and cutting aircraft production to fewer than five aircraft per month, from a target of 20 aircraft per month.

=== FBI investigation ===
In June 2021, a group of minority shareholders in Icon Aircraft, including former Icon board member and ex-Boeing CEO Phil Condit, and former Icon CEO Kirk Hawkins, filed a lawsuit with the Delaware Chancery Court to prevent the Chinese state-owned majority company shareholder, Pudong Science and Technology Investment Inc. (PDSTI), from transferring technology to China.

The suit states, "since becoming the controlling stockholder of Icon in 2017, PDSTI has disregarded its duties to minority shareholders, seized control of the management of the company, operated Icon as its own property, and systematically dismantled the company, thereby destroying the value of Icon and its shares, all in support of its goal to expropriate Icon’s intellectual property to China." In a statement, Condit wrote, "I believe strongly that good governance is at the very heart of a trustworthy economic system. The board has a fiduciary responsibility to all shareholders and without that trust, critical investments cannot be made. If Chinese investments are masquerading as venture capital to gain access to U.S. technology, it violates this trust … the investments by PDSTI in Icon were never intended to make the company successful. Rather they were part of a plan to gain technology and defraud minority shareholders."

In January 2022, The Wall Street Journal reported that the Federal Bureau of Investigation and the Committee on Foreign Investment in the United States were investigating the deal for potential criminal violations as well as national security concerns. The complaints alleged that the Chinese take-over had military implications, saying the aircraft could be used as a military drone. Icon denied the accusation, saying "the plane is loaded with stylistic and safety features that make the plane wholly unsuited for military application" and indicated the move was just an attempt by former CEO Kirk Hawkins to regain control of the company after having invited Chinese investment by PDSTI.

=== Bankruptcy ===
On April 4, 2024, Icon Aircraft filed for Chapter 11 bankruptcy. The company is considering other options to save itself, including a possible sale.

Four months later, the firm reported that SG Investment America had completed the purchase of its assets, as well as creating a new entity to manage them.

== Icon A5 ==
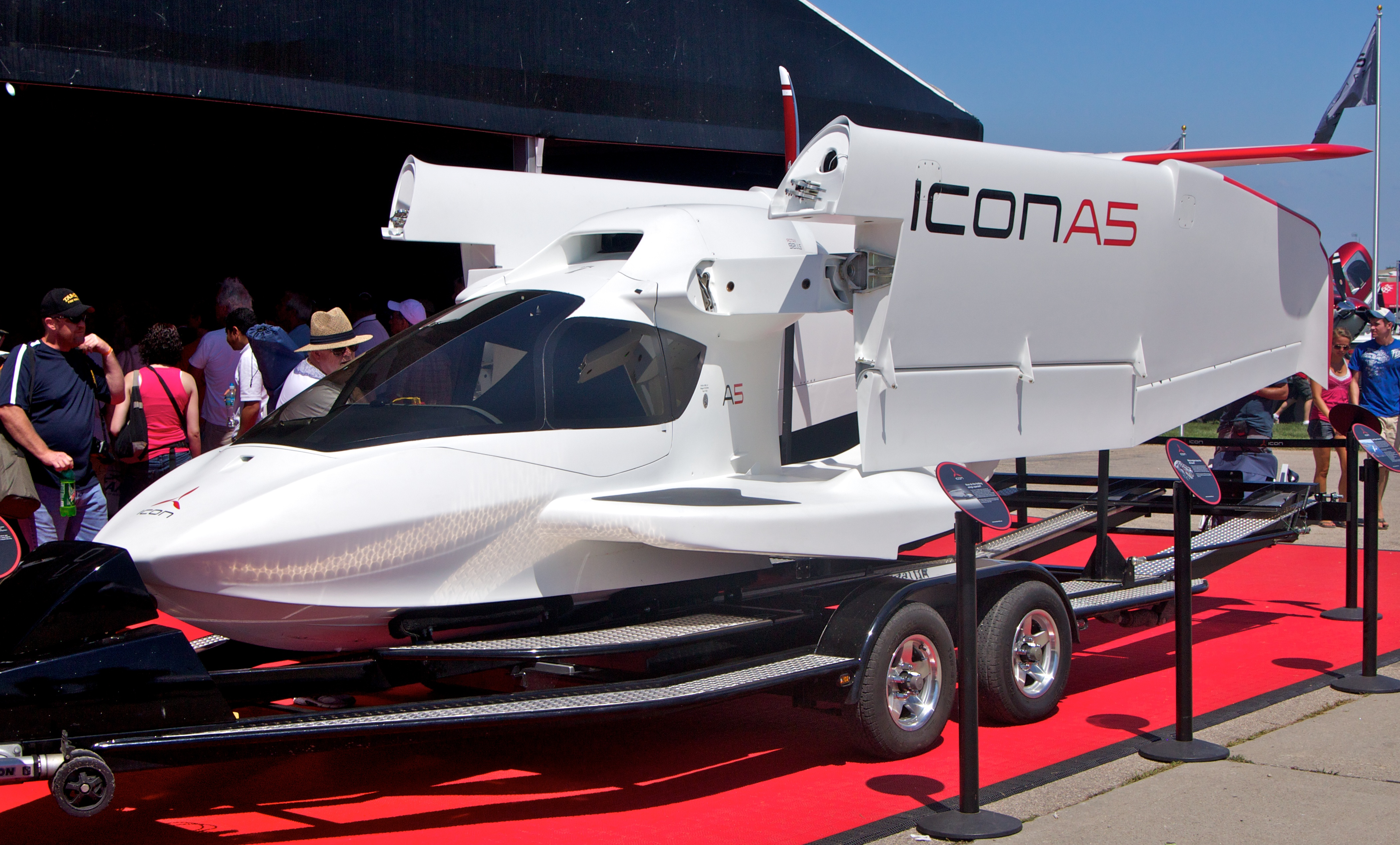
Icon A5 with wings folded in 2010

Icon Aircraft's first model is the Icon A5, an amphibious two-seat, light-sport aircraft to be priced at approximately $189,000. Its folding wings facilitate transportation and storage, and it will have a range of approximately 300 nautical miles (560 km) and a top speed of 105 knots (120 mph).

The company had nearly 1400 orders in August 2014 and at that time anticipated the first customer delivery in May 2015, although the first official A5 customer deliveries did not occur until 2016.

On July 28, 2014, Icon Aircraft unveiled the first production Icon A5 built with production tooling and using production methods and components. This aircraft successfully completed its first flight July 7, 2014.

In April 2016, the Icon A5 purchaser's agreement was made public and was noted by the aviation media as containing many controversial elements not usually found in aircraft purchase agreements. These include contractually-required pilot training, maintenance, agreements not to sue, and a camera and recorder to monitor pilot behavior, that is owned by the manufacturer but must be maintained by the owner. Owners also must agree to be "supportive" of the company. In the case of a resale, future owners are required to sign the same agreement or face penalties. There are indications that a number of A5 position holders have canceled their purchases based on the wording of the agreement.

In May 2016, the company admitted that the released contract had been a mistake. Company CEO, Kirk Hawkins, stated, "it should not have gone out in the form it went out without an explanation. [Customers] had a right to be taken aback." The company issued a revised contract that removed many, but not all, of the controversial elements.

== Facilities ==
Icon Aircraft's headquarters are located in Vacaville, California, where all manufacturing, engineering, design, training, sales, and service functions are consolidated. It also has an office in Los Angeles, California, where the company was founded. ICON formerly operated an engineering and manufacturing facility in Tehachapi, California, where the A5 was initially developed and tested.

On August 6, 2012, it was announced that Cirrus Aircraft would become one of the key strategic supplier partners for the Icon A5 amphibious light sport aircraft. The companies agreed that Cirrus, the manufacturer of the leading SR20 and SR22 lines of high-performance single-engine aircraft, will produce a significant portion of the composite airframe components for Icon Aircraft in their Grand Forks, North Dakota, facility.

In September 2016, the company announced that production of the composite parts would be undertaken at a facility in Mexico.
