= Icon of the Seas =

Royal Caribbean International cruise ship

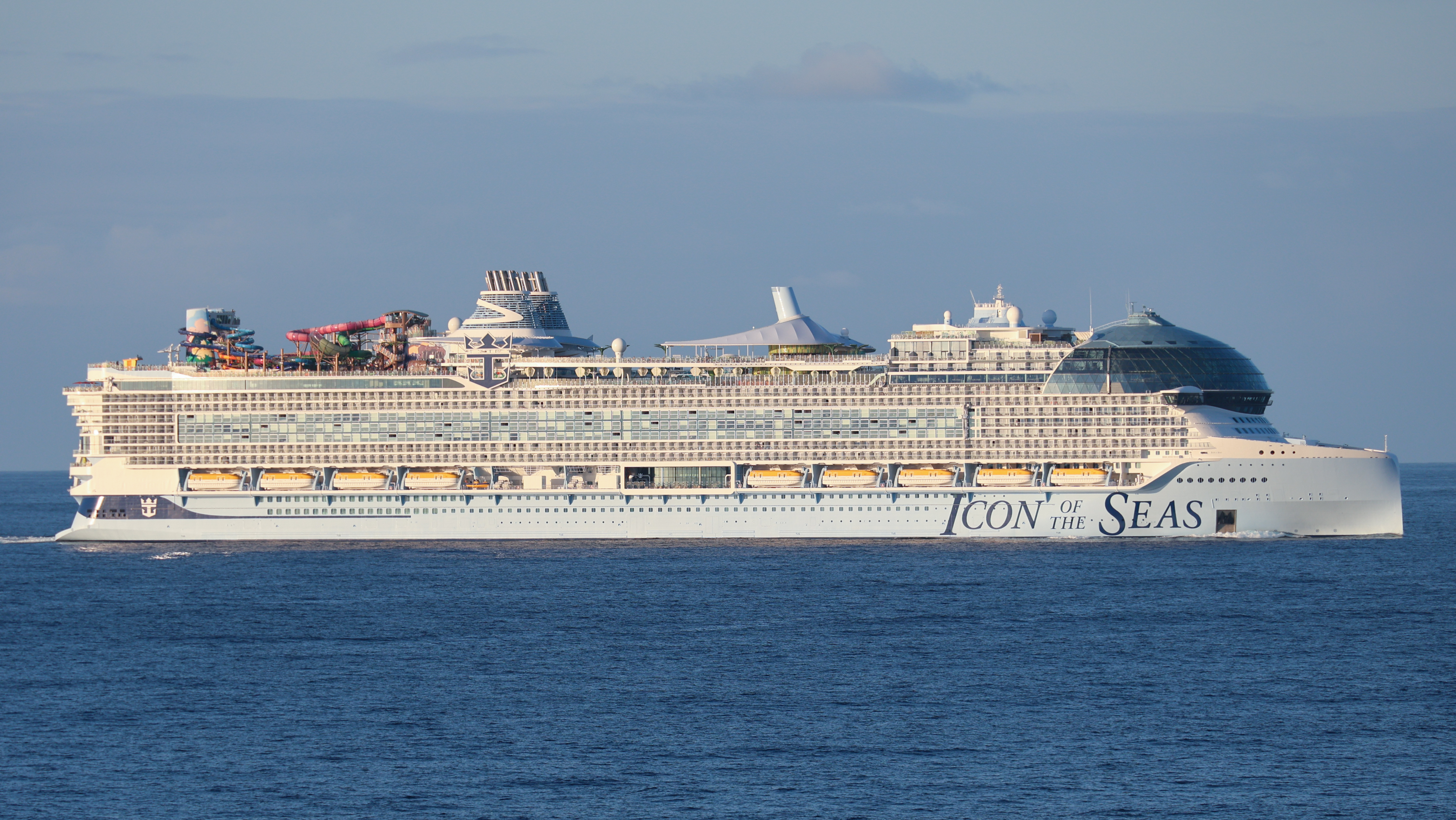
- Icon of the Seas near Puerto Rico in January 2025

History

Bahamas
- Name: Icon of the Seas
- Owner: Royal Caribbean Group
- Operator: Royal Caribbean International
- Port of registry: Nassau, Bahamas
- Builder: Meyer Turku, Turku, Finland
- Cost: €1.86 billion
- Yard number: NB 1400
- Laid down: 4 April 2022
- Launched: 9 December 2022
- Sponsored by: Lionel Messi
- Christened: 23 January 2024
- Acquired: 27 November 2023
- Maiden voyage: 27 January 2024
- In service: 2024–present
- Identification: Call sign: C6FU5; IMO number: 9829930; MMSI number: 311001178; DNV ID: 38545
- Status: In service

General characteristics
- Class & type: Icon-class cruise ship
- Tonnage: 248,663 GT, 307,895 NT
- Length: 364.75 metres (1,196 ft 8 in)
- Beam: 48.47 m (159 ft 0 in)
- Draught: 9.25 metres (30 ft 4 in)
- Decks: 20
- Installed power: 3 × Wärtsilä 14V46DF, 16,030 kW (21,790 hp) each; 3 × Wärtsilä 12V46DF, 13,740 kW (18,680 hp) each
- Propulsion: Diesel-electric; 3 × 20 MW (27,000 hp) ABB Azipod, all azimuthing; 5 × 4.8 MW (6,400 hp) Wärtsilä WTT-45 CP bow thrusters
- Speed: 22 knots (41 km/h)
- Capacity: 5,610 passengers (double occupancy); 7,600 passengers (maximum capacity)
- Crew: 2,350

Icon of the Seas is a cruise ship operated by Royal Caribbean International and is the lead ship of the Icon class. She entered service on 27 January 2024 out of the Port of Miami in the United States. At 248,663 gross tonnage (GT), Icon of the Seas and her sister ships, built by Meyer Turku in Finland, are the largest cruise ships in the world.

== History ==
=== Planning ===
In October 2016, Royal Caribbean and Finnish shipbuilder Meyer Turku announced an order to build two ships under the project name "Icon". The ships were expected to be delivered in the third quarter of 2023 and in 2025 and would be classified by DNV.

Royal Caribbean applied to register a trademark for "Icon of the Seas" in 2016.

=== Construction ===
Steel-cutting for Icon of the Seas began in June 2021. In October 2021, Royal Caribbean announced that the first LNG tank for the ship was installed at Neptun Werft in Rostock, Germany. In December 2021, the floating engine room unit, including the LNG tanks, was towed to Turku in Finland by tug. The keel was laid in April 2022. The ship was launched 9 December 2022. In May 2022, Royal Caribbean confirmed that Icon of the Seas would be bigger than the Oasis class.

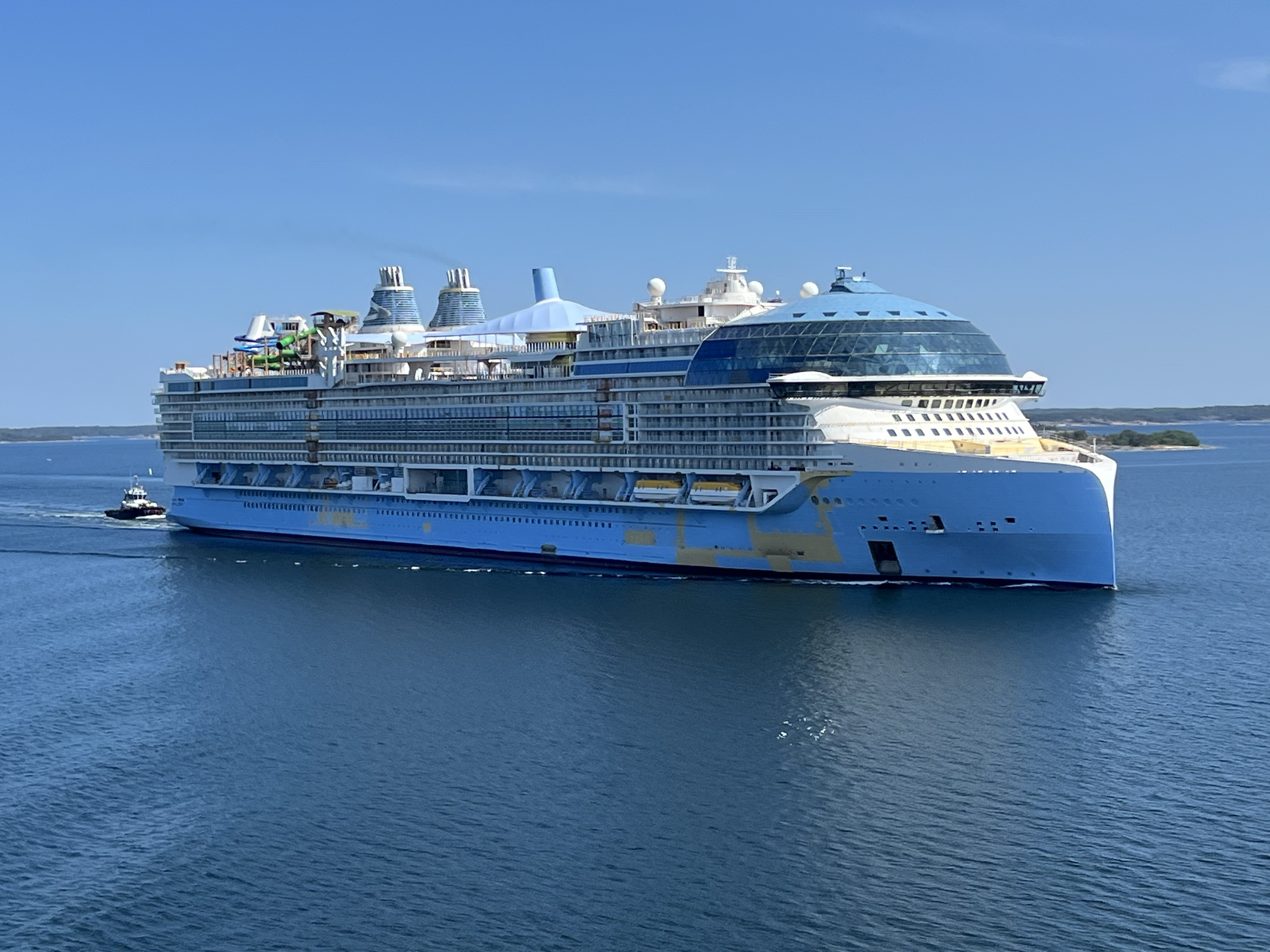
Icon of the Seas during sea trials

On 19 June 2023, Icon of the Seas sailed for the first of her sea trials. She returned to the Meyer Turku shipyard on 22 June for adjustments to her systems, and to have interior spaces completed and furnished.

On 27 November 2023, the ship was handed over to Royal Caribbean. The ship retracted her funnel to pass under the Great Belt Bridge in Denmark, and docked at the Navantia Shipyard in Cádiz, Spain, for final outfitting work. She departed Cadiz on 23 December for Puerto Rico and on 10 January 2024 arrived at her home port, PortMiami.

=== Christening ===
On 23 January 2024, the naming ceremony was held and Icon of the Seas was christened by soccer player Lionel Messi. Her maiden voyage began on 27 January out of PortMiami.

== Design ==
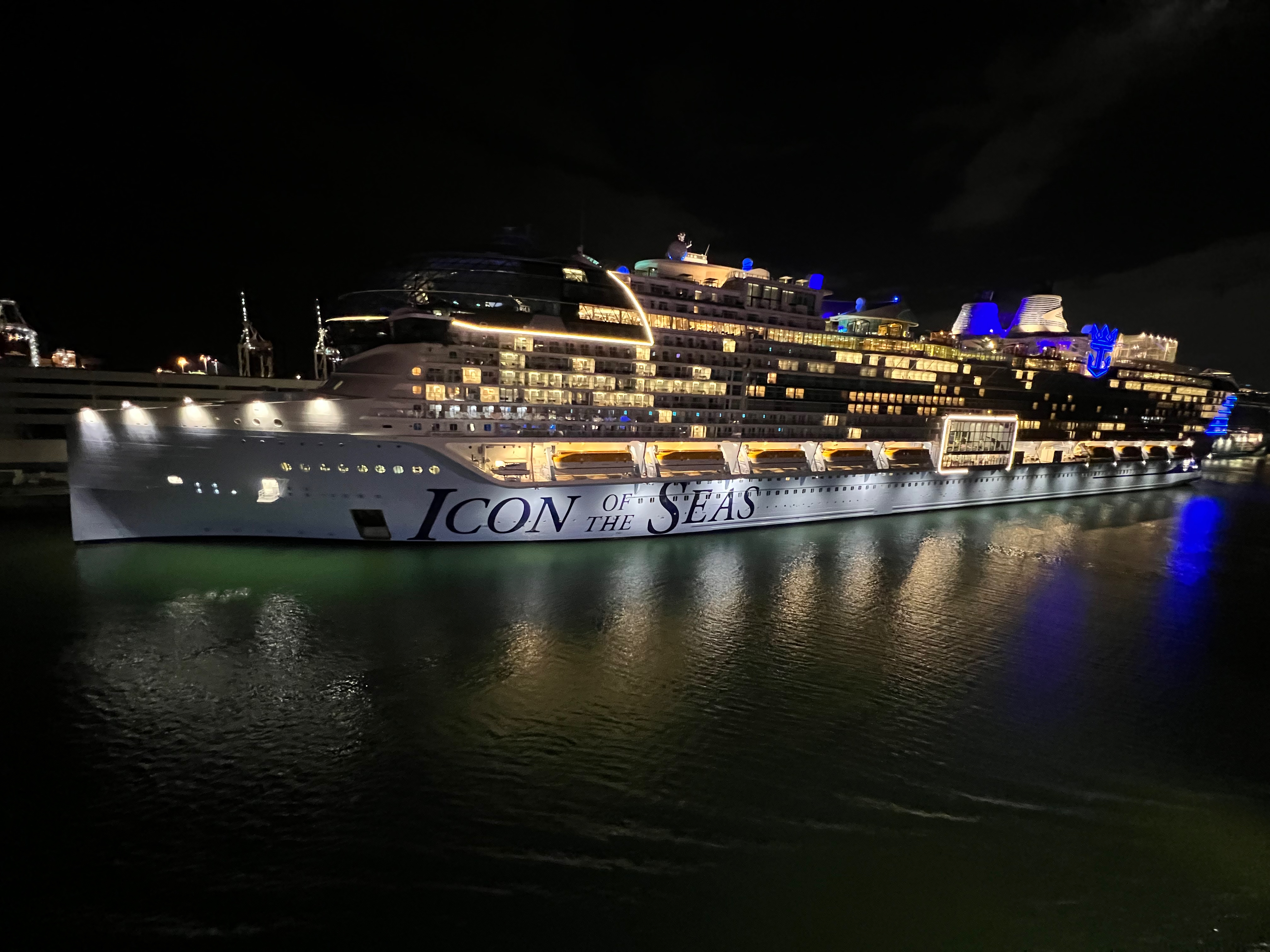
Icon of the Seas in PortMiami

Icon of the Seas can be powered by liquefied natural gas (LNG). The ship has six multi-fuel Wärtsilä engines; these can be powered with both LNG and distillate fuel. Icon of the Seas is the first Royal Caribbean vessel to use such technology.

Icon of the Seas is the largest cruise ship in the world by gross tonnage, a title also held by sister ships Star of the Seas and Legend of the Seas. The ship has a crew of 2,350, and a capacity of 5,610 passengers at double occupancy, or 7,600 passengers at maximum capacity. Icon of the Seas has 20 decks with seven swimming pools and six water slides. The company claims the ship has the tallest waterfall, the tallest water slide, and the largest waterpark of any cruise ship.

=== Features ===
The ship was designed by a team of architects and designers, including Wilson Butler Architects, 3Deluxe, RTKL, and Skylab Architecture. The designers introduced new concepts including:

- Aquadome: A diving and performance venue under a glass dome on the top of the ship
- The Pearl: A structural feature designed as a dynamic art installation on the Royal Promenade
- Absolute Zero: Ice skating rink and entertainment venue
- Surfside: Family neighborhood
- The Hideaway: Beach club featuring first suspended infinity pool of any ship
- Thrill Island: The largest waterpark at sea, featuring six different water slides
- Swim & Tonic: Largest swim up bar at sea
- Jogging track: A 670-metre-long (2,197 ft) loop that wraps around the ship's perimeter on Deck 5

== Incidents ==
In May 2024, a passenger reportedly jumped from Icon of the Seas. He was recovered by a rescue boat from the cruise ship and later pronounced dead.

On 25 June 2024, a fire was reported onboard while docked at Costa Maya, Mexico. Electrical power was lost for a while but the flames were quickly extinguished, with the damage being "minimal" according to the cruise line.

On 24 July 2025, a crew member, a 35-year-old South African man, allegedly stabbed a fellow crew member, a 28-year-old South African woman, multiple times on board the Icon of the Seas cruise ship. The man then fled the scene and jumped off the ship, according to police. He was later found dead by onboard medical staff.

== Environmental impact ==
Although LNG/methane burns significantly less polluting than diesel, overall emissions depend on methane leakage. Environmental groups (ICCT and T&E) have said that LNG is a more damaging fuel as it releases more harmful greenhouse gas emissions than marine gas oil through the engine. Nick Rose, a vice-president of Royal Caribbean, said "We consider [LNG] a transitional fuel that helps build flexibility into our ship design ... LNG is one part of our alternative fuel strategy, along with biofuels, methanol and other energy sources like shore power".

Although reportedly being more fuel efficient than the previous Oasis class, the environmental impact of the Icon of the Seas remains considerable. In particular Royal Caribbean cite the use of LNG as one of the most remarkable advances in reducing the emissions of cruise ships. Critics say that LNG is still a fossil fuel producing carbon dioxide and the engine itself could lead to methane leaks, a greenhouse gas more harmful than carbon dioxide.

== Gallery ==
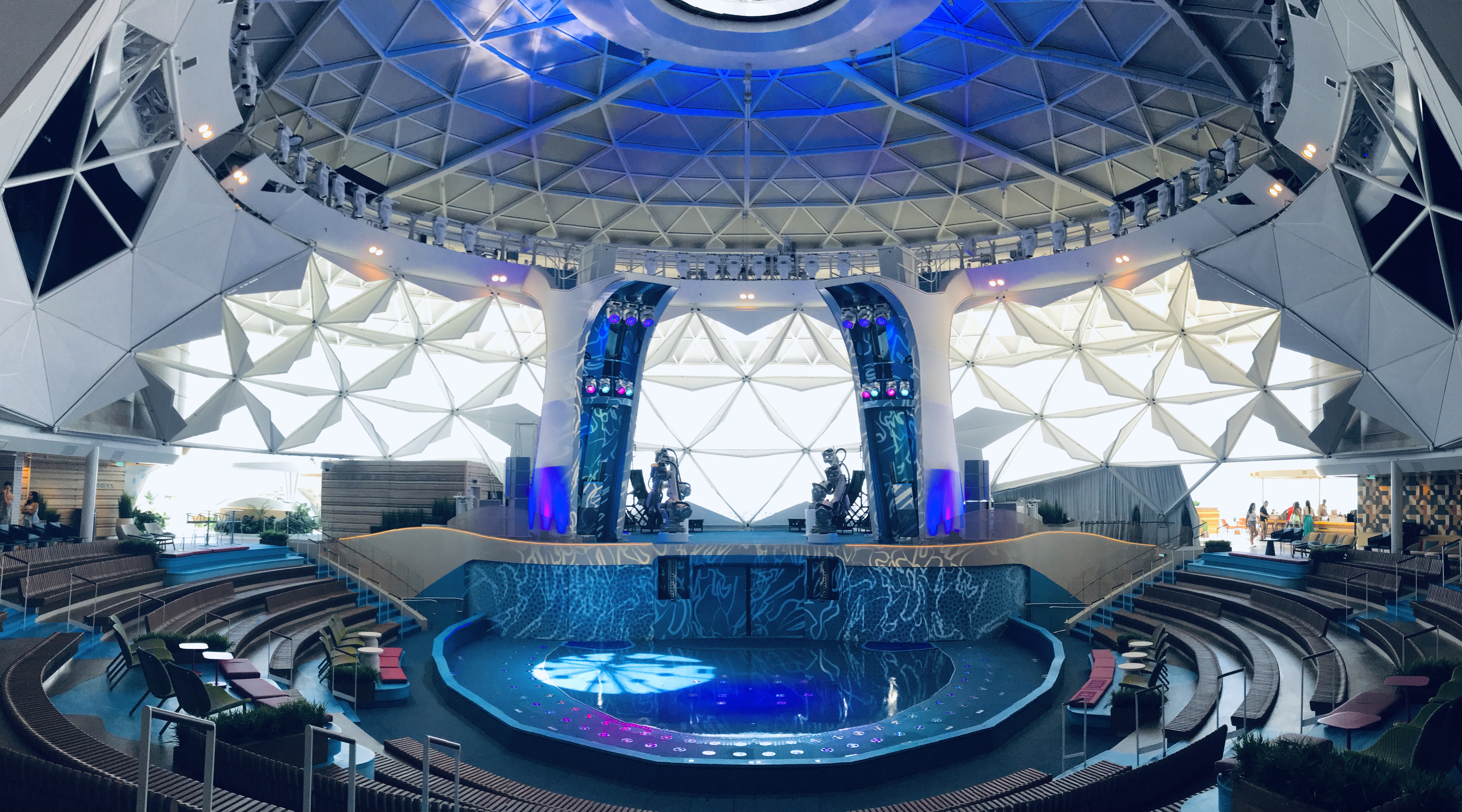
Aquadome

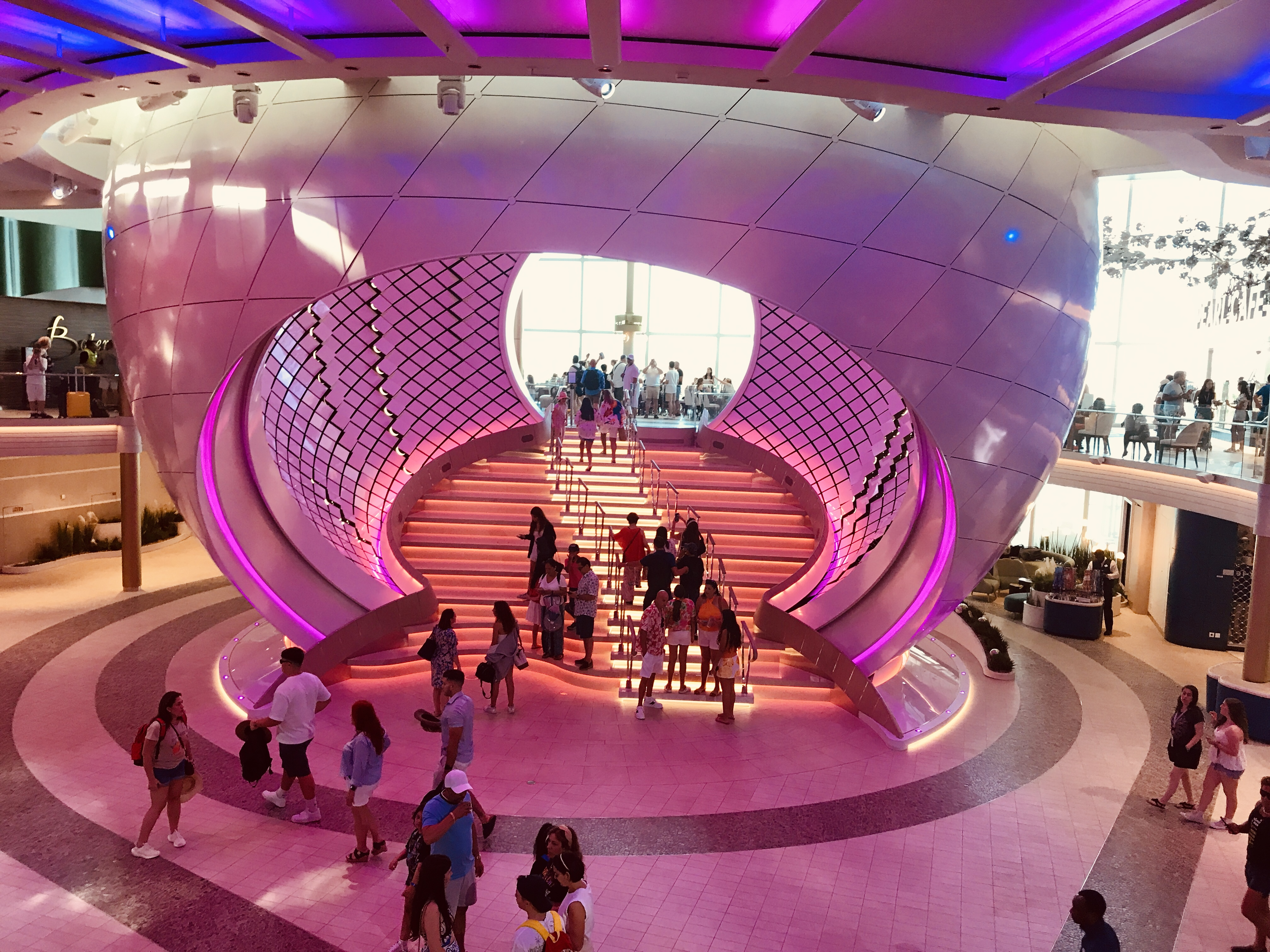
The Pearl, structural art installation on the Royal Promenade

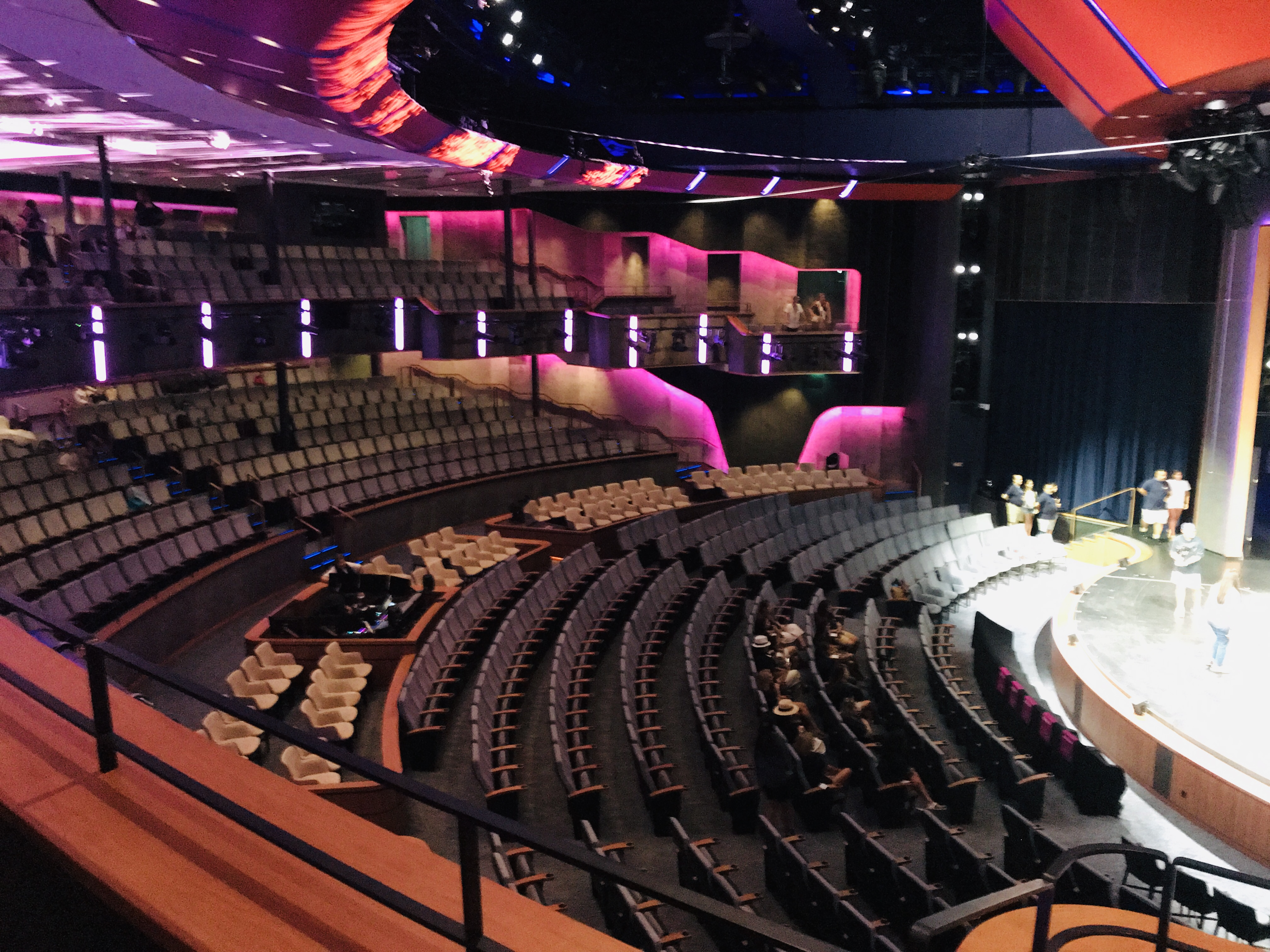
The Royal Theater

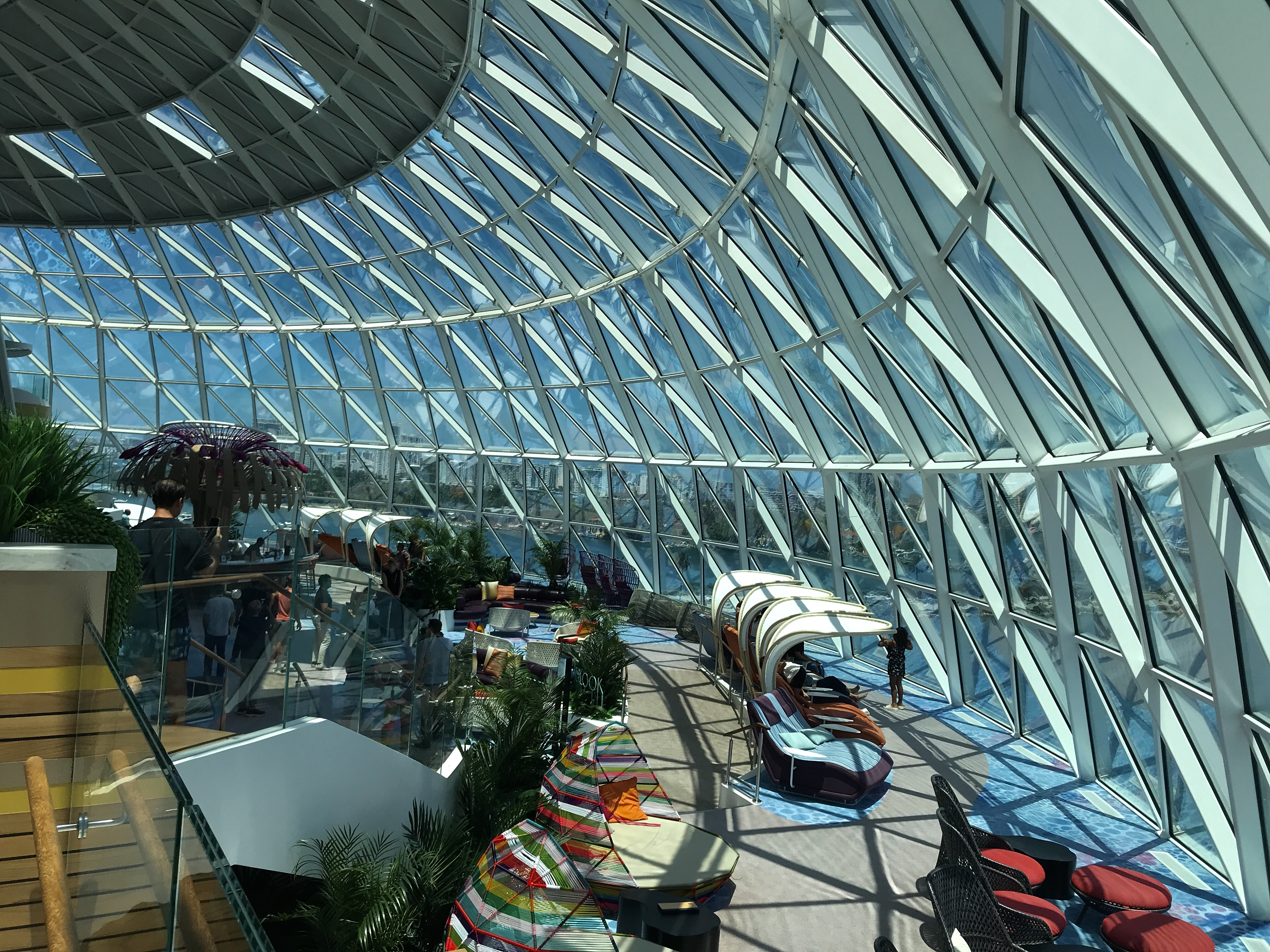
The Overlook Bar in the Aquadome

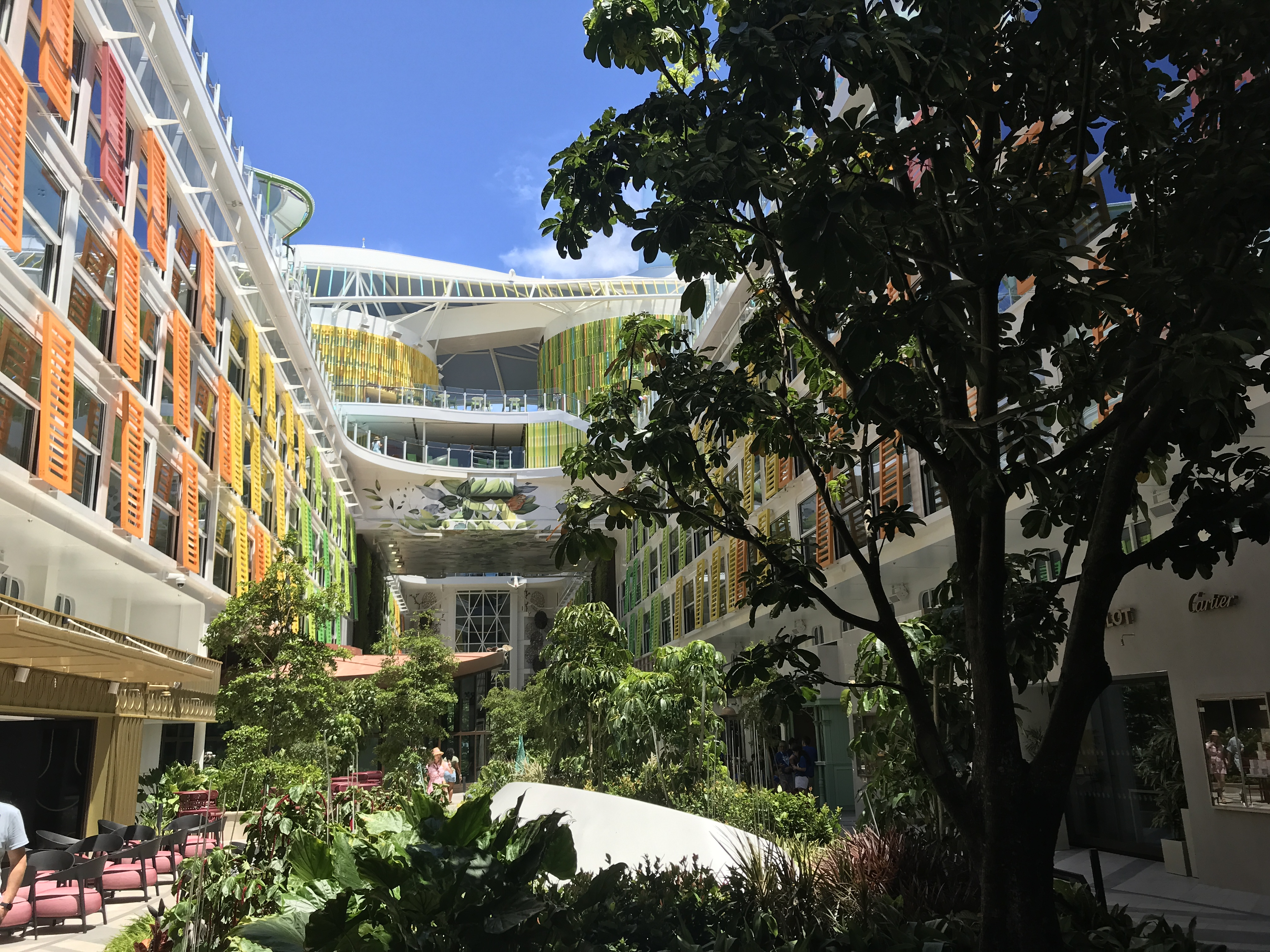
Central Park

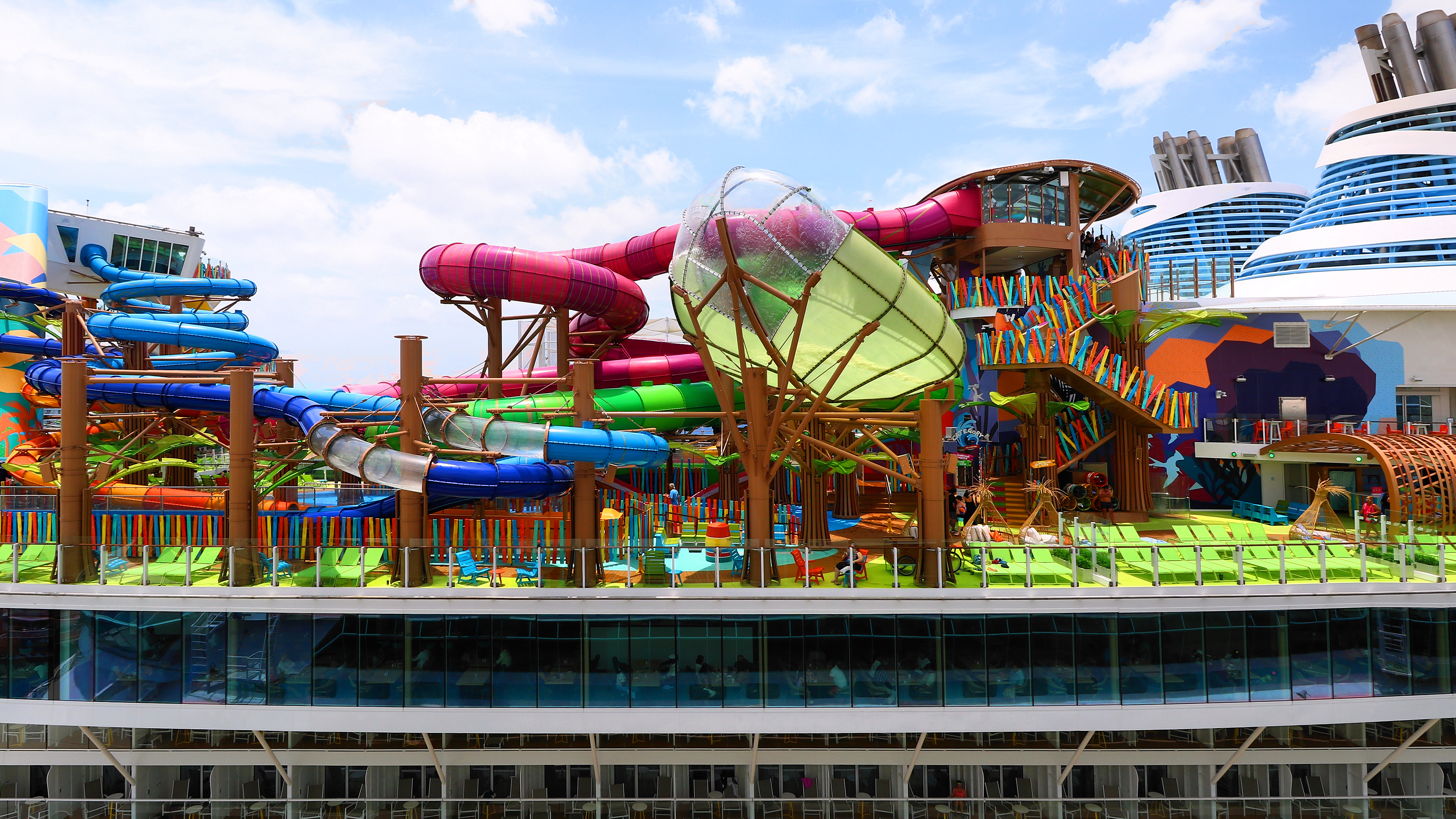
Thrill Island water park

== See also ==
- Star of the Seas
- Legend of the Seas
