= Jim C. Hines =

American novelist (born 1974)

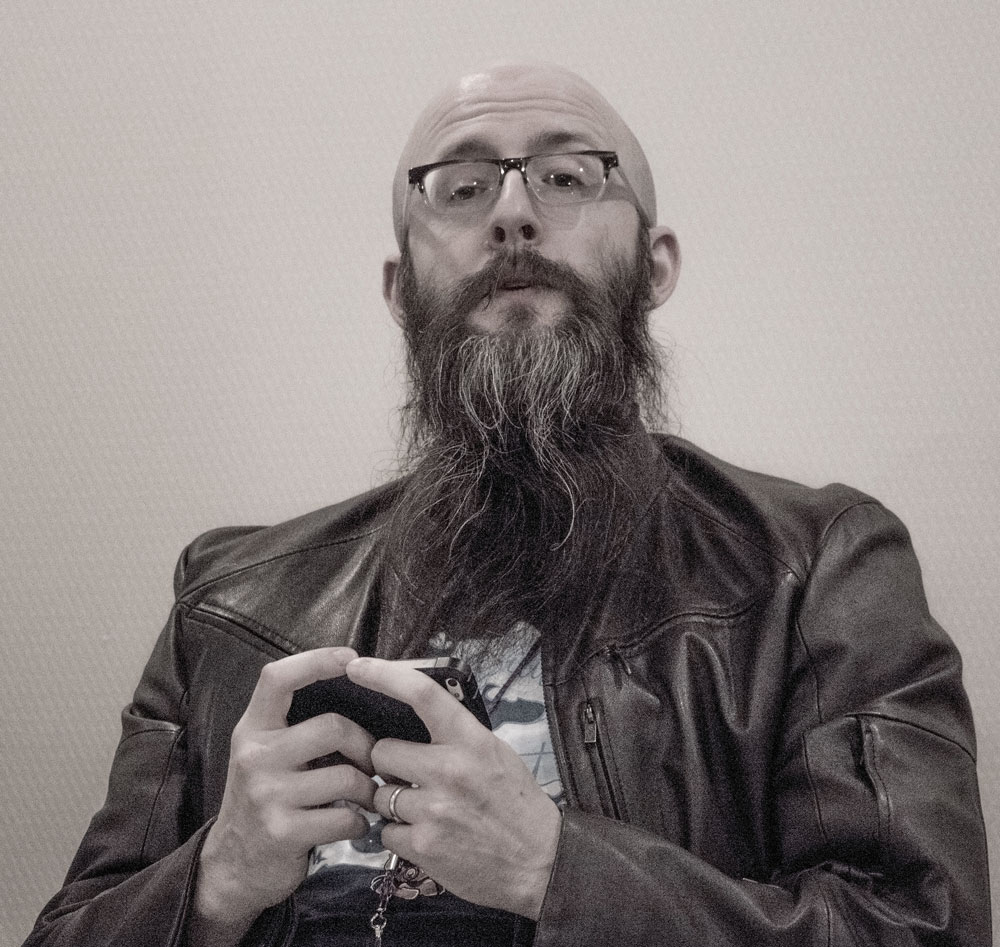
- Hines at ConFusion in 2017
- Born: April 15, 1974 (age 52); Pennsylvania
- Occupation: Writer
- Writing career
- Genres: Fantasy, science fiction
- Notable awards: Writers of the Future, Hugo Award for Best Fan Writer
- Website: www.jimchines.com

Jim C. Hines (born April 15, 1974) is an American fantasy and science fiction writer. His work is published by DAW Books, and some of his books have appeared on the Locus Bestseller list.

== Life and work ==
Hines was a volunteer crisis counselor in East Lansing and worked as the Male Outreach Coordinator for the MSU Safe Place. In 2008, he donated his archive to the Science Fiction and Fantasy Writers of America (SFWA) Collection in the department of Rare Books and Special Collections at Northern Illinois University. He has been the author guest of honor at multiple conventions, and was the Toastmaster for the 2014 NASFiC (North American Science Fiction Convention). He's also served as Toastmaster for Icon (Iowa science fiction convention) since 2012. He currently lives near Lansing, Michigan, where he works part-time for state government.

He is the author of one non-fantasy novel, Goldfish Dreams, described on the author's website as a "mainstream rape-awareness novel."

Hines' works have been recognized and highlighted at Michigan State University in their Michigan Writers Series. He was a first-place winner of the L. Ron Hubbard Writers of the Future Award in 1998 with his story "Blade of the Bunny".

In 2012, he won the Hugo Award for Best Fan Writer.

== "Striking a Pose" ==
In January 2012, Hines posted on his blog with the headline "Striking a Pose (Women and Fantasy Covers)", a discussion triggered by some of the poses in which female characters are drawn on the covers of books in his Princess Series. Hines attempted to mirror some of these anatomically incorrect poses on the covers of one of his own works and those of a variety of other fantasists. The resulting discussion continued, in such venues as Jezebel.com. Hines has participated in several panel discussions at science fiction conventions such as one at the feminist convention WisCon, where a group of women including a gymnast and a dancer attempted (with limited success) to recreate such poses; and in a posing competition (benefits to charity) with fellow Hugo-winner John Scalzi, which has brought the discussion and others like it such as The Hawkeye Initiative to the attention of Boing Boing and other publications, including political blogs like ThinkProgress.

== Bibliography ==
=== The Goblin Quest Series ===
- Goblin Quest (2006) DAW (ISBN 0-7564040-0-2)
- Goblin Hero (2007) DAW (ISBN 0-7564044-2-8)
- Goblin War (2008) DAW (ISBN 0-7564049-3-2)
- Goblin Tales (2011) Self-published

=== Princess Series ===
- The Stepsister Scheme (2009) DAW (ISBN 0-7564053-2-7)
- The Mermaid's Madness (2009) DAW (ISBN 0-7564058-3-1)
- Red Hood's Revenge (2010) DAW (ISBN 0-7564060-8-0)
- The Snow Queen's Shadow (2011) DAW (ISBN 0-7564067-4-9)

=== Magic ex Libris Series ===
- Libriomancer (2012) DAW (ISBN 0-7564073-9-7)
- Codex Born (2013) DAW (ISBN 0-7564081-6-4)
- Unbound (2015) DAW (ISBN 0-7564096-8-3)
- "Chupacabra's Song" (2015)
- Revisionary (2016) DAW (ISBN 0-7564097-0-5)
- Imprinted: a Magic ex Libris Novelette (2018) Self-published (ISBN 978-1982090159)

=== Janitors of the Post-Apocalypse Series ===
- Terminal Alliance (2017) DAW (ISBN 978-0756412746)
- Terminal Uprising (2019) DAW (ISBN 978-0756412777)
- Terminal Peace (2022) DAW (ISBN 978-0756412807)

=== Stand-alone works ===
- Goldfish Dreams (2003) Regal Crest Enterprises (ISBN 1-9323000-3-1)
- Fable: Blood of Heroes (2015) Del Rey (ISBN 978-0-345-54234-2)
- Tamora Carter: Goblin Queen (2020) (ISBN 978-1-7352662-0-6)
- Amelia Sand and the Silver Queens (2023) (ISBN 979-8857933749, 979-8869343024)
- Kitemaster (2025) Caezik SF&F (ISBN 978-1647101596)
- Slayers of Old (2025) DAW (ISBN 978-0756419684)
- Unchosen Ones (2027) DAW (ISBN 978-0756421199)

=== Collections ===
- The Goblin Master's Grimoire (2013) ISFiC (ISBN 978-0985798994)

=== Edited works ===
- Heroes in Training (with Martin H. Greenberg), DAW (2007) (ISBN 0-7564043-8-X)
- Invisible (2014)
- Invisible 2 (2015)
- Invisible 3 (with Mary Anne Mohanraj) (2017)
