= List of postmodern television programs =

Art and philosophy of postmodernism in television

Postmodern television is a category or period of modern television related to the art and philosophy of postmodernism, often making use of postmodern principles such as satire, irony, and deconstruction.

== List of postmodernist shows ==
- 30 Rock
- Arrested Development
- The Bachelor
- Black Mirror
- Bob's Burgers
- Breaking Bad
- The Adventures of Rocky and Bullwinkle and Friends
- Catfish
- The Colbert Report
- Community
- Curb Your Enthusiasm
- Ed, Edd n Eddy
- Fallout
- Family Guy
- Fleabag
- Freakazoid!
- Futurama
- Hell on Wheels
- Inventing Anna
- It's Always Sunny in Philadelphia
- The Larry Sanders Show
- Magpie Murders
- Miami Vice
- Monty Python's Flying Circus
- Mystery Science Theater 3000
- Neon Genesis Evangelion
- The Office
- The Prisoner
- Real Housewives
- The Rehearsal
- The Ren & Stimpy Show
- Rick and Morty
- Riverdale
- RuPaul's Drag Race
- Scrubs
- Seinfeld
- The Simpsons
- The Singing Detective
- The Sopranos
- South Park
- Space Ghost: Coast to Coast
- Spartacus
- SpongeBob SquarePants
- Stranger Things
- True Detective
- The Twilight Zone
- Twin Peaks
- Vanderpump Rules
- WandaVision
- The X-Files

== See also ==
- Postmodernist film
- Golden Age of Television (2000s–present)
- Reality television
- Pop culture fiction
- Quality television
