= Icon-class cruise ship =

Class of Royal Caribbean International cruise ships

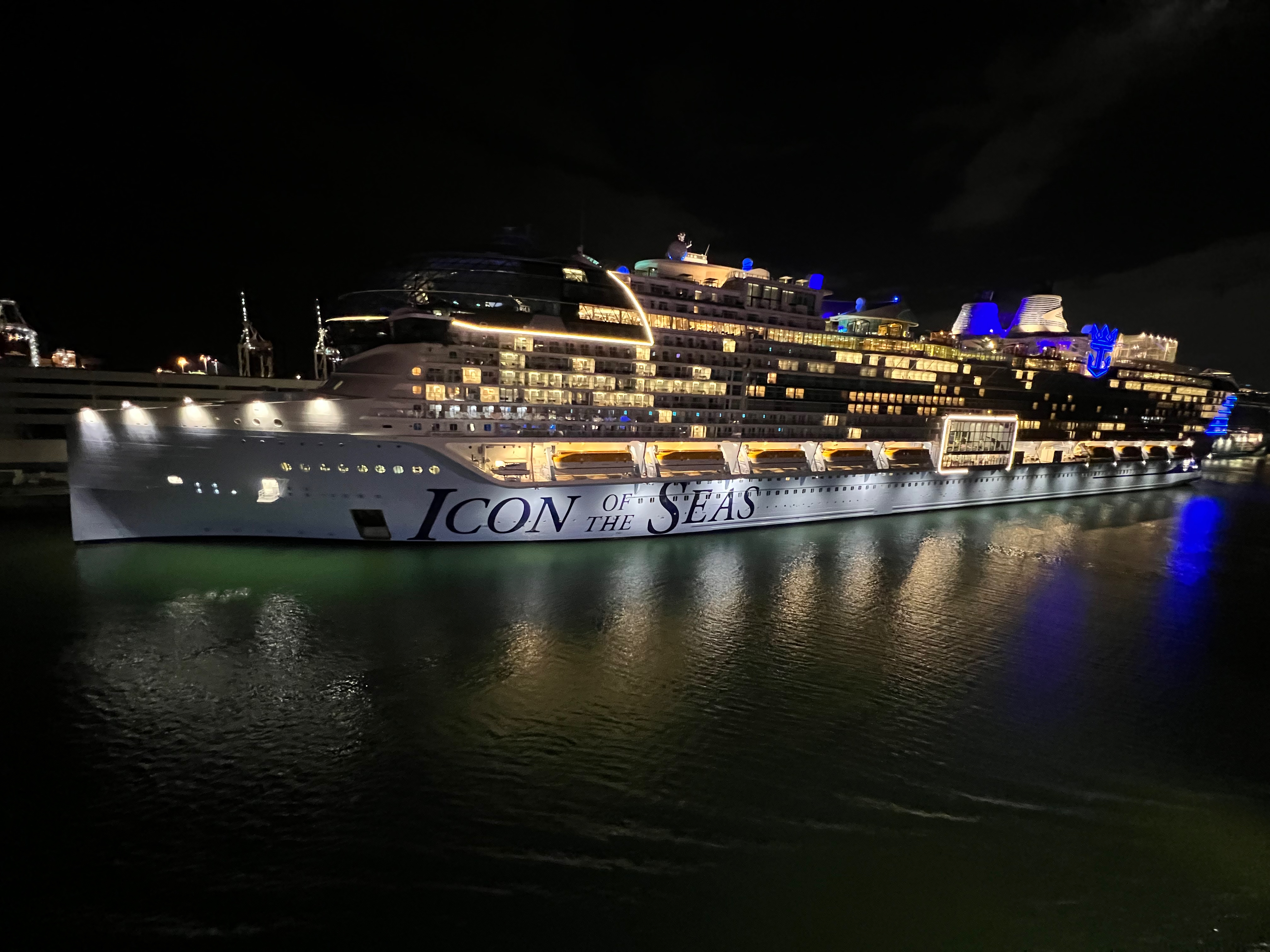
- Icon of the Seas docked in PortMiami on January 27, 2024

Class overview
- Builders: Meyer Turku, Turku, Finland
- Operators: Royal Caribbean International
- Preceded by: Quantum class; Oasis class
- Succeeded by: Discovery class (planned, Freedom-class cruise ship sized)
- Planned: 7
- Building: 2
- Completed: 3
- Active: 3

General characteristics
- Type: Cruise ship
- Tonnage: 248,663 GT
- Length: 364.75 m (1,196 ft 8 in)
- Beam: 48.47 m (159 ft 0 in) (waterline); 66 m (216 ft 6 in) (max)
- Height: 75.6 m (248 ft 0 in)
- Draught: 9.25 m (30 ft 4 in)
- Decks: 20
- Installed power: 3 × Wärtsilä 14V46DF, 16,030 kW (21,790 hp) each; 3 × Wärtsilä 12V46DF, 13,740 kW (18,680 hp) each
- Propulsion: Diesel-electric; 3 × 20 MW (27,000 hp) ABB Azipod, all azimuthing; 5 × 4.8 MW (6,400 hp) Wärtsilä WTT-45 CP bow thrusters
- Speed: 22 knots (41 km/h; 25 mph)
- Capacity: 5,610 passengers (double occupancy); 7,600 passengers (maximum capacity)
- Crew: 2,350

The Icon class (formerly Project Icon) is a class of cruise ships ordered by Royal Caribbean International to be built by Meyer Turku in Turku, Finland. As of 2026, this class is the largest cruise ship class ever constructed. Royal Caribbean plans to have at least seven Icon-class ships, which will include Icon of the Seas (entered service in 2024), Star of the Seas (entered service in 2025), Legend of the Seas (entered service in 2026), and Hero of the Seas (entering service in 2027). Furthermore, Royal Caribbean has announced orders for additional three ships which are expected to enter service in 2028, 2029, and 2030 respectively.

== History ==
On 10 October 2016, Royal Caribbean and Meyer Turku announced an order to build two ships under the project name "Icon". Icon of the Seas was delivered on 27 November 2023, and the second ship, Star of the Seas, was delivered in July 2025. The ships will be classified by DNV.

Royal Caribbean applied to register a trademark for "Icon of the Seas" in 2016, which was at the time suggested as an indication of the name of the first ship.

In July 2019, Royal Caribbean announced an order for a third ship. The third ship is planned to be delivered in 2026, one year after Star of the Seas.

Steel-cutting for Icon of the Seas began on 14 June 2021, and the keel was laid on 5 April 2022.

Steel-cutting for the second ship, Star of the Seas, began on 15 February 2023. Parts of the ship are built at Meyer Werft, Papenburg and also at Gdańsk shipyard Marine Projects Ltd.

Icon of the Seas arrived in her home port of PortMiami, US on 10 January 2024 for the first time after leaving Europe in December, with the inaugural passenger sailing occurring on 27 January 2024.

Steel-cutting for the third ship, Legend of the Seas, began in January 2024.

In August 2024 an order for a fourth ship to be delivered in 2027 was announced and options for two additional ships.

In September 2025, Royal Caribbean announced an order for a fifth ship, scheduled for delivery in 2028 and slots booked for more ships, including two more Icon class, up to 2036.

In April 2026, Royal Caribbean confirmed order for the sixth and seventh ships.

== Design ==
The ships will be powered by liquefied natural gas, with a gross tonnage of about 250,800 GT. Ships will contain other alternative energy features, like the use of fuel cells to produce electricity and fresh water. They will have a capacity of 5,600 berths.

The Icon class is the first Royal Caribbean ship to feature a parabolic bow design, which is intended to aid stability and provide smoother motion.

In 2020, the director of projects and facilities at Nassau Cruise Port said that the specifications for the Icon class indicate it would be larger than the Oasis class. Later, in May 2022, Royal Caribbean confirmed that Icon of the Seas would be bigger than the Oasis class.

== Ships ==
| Name | Status | Entering service | Gross tonnage | Length | Shipyard number | Image |
|---|---|---|---|---|---|---|
| Icon of the Seas | In service | 27 January 2024 | 248,663 | 364.75 metres (1,196 ft 8 in) | NB-1400 | |
| Star of the Seas | In service | 31 August 2025 | 248,663 | 364.83 metres (1,196 ft 11 in) | NB-1401 | |
| Legend of the Seas | In service | 4 July 2026 | 248,663 | 364.84 metres (1,197 ft 0 in) | NB-1402 | |
| Hero of the Seas | Floated out | Q3 2027 | 248,663 | | NB-1403 | |
| TBA | keel laid | Q2 2028 | | | NB-1408 | |
| TBA | Ordered | 2029 | | | NB-1409 | |
| TBA | Ordered | 2030 | | | | |
