= Icon Theatre =

Icon Theatre is a Kent-based UK touring theatre company producing visual and physical theatre. Icon theatre is run by co-founder Nancy Hirst (artistic) and Sally Armstrong (administrative).

== Productions ==
- Release, 2011, about 3 young people newly released from prison, winner of a Fringe First Award at Edinburgh Festival Fringe and was awarded five stars by FringeReview
- Hard Times, Warehouse Theatre, 2008.
- Gradgrind, UK Tour, 2008.
- The Odyssey, UK Tour, 2007.
- The Canterbury Tales, UK Tour, 2006.
- Skeleton Woman, Lady Death, BAC Festival of Visual Theatre, 2004.
- The Men's Room, by Joshua James, Warehouse Theatre, 2002.

== Reception ==
- 'Icon has achieved something remarkable...this is a theatrical treat' - The Stage.
- 'Fantastic - a fun evening out' - London Evening Standard.
- 'Inventive, funny & interesting' - Time Out.
