= AnimeIowa =

Anime convention in Coralville, Iowa

Coordinates: 41°40′54.5″N 91°33′30.9″W

Anime Iowa
- AnimeIowa's mascot, Buu-Chan
- Status: Active
- Venue: Hyatt Regency Coralville Hotel & Conference Center
- Location: Coralville, Iowa
- Country: United States
- Inaugurated: 1997
- Attendance: 3,000
- Organizer: Mindbridge Foundation
- Website: http://www.animeiowa.com

AnimeIowa is an annual three-day anime convention held during July at the Hyatt Regency Coralville Hotel & Conference Center in Coralville, Iowa. The staff are all volunteers and the convention is run by the non-profit Mindbridge Foundation.

== Programming ==
The convention typically offers artist alley, cosplay contests, dealers room, idol festival, Maid Café, masquerade, tabletop gaming, video gaming, and video rooms. In 2011, the Maid Café benefited We Heart Japan, a charity supporting 2011 Tōhoku earthquake and tsunami victims. AnimeIowa held a fundraiser to benefit Swisher's Miracles in Motion in 2014. The 2025 charity auction benefited Tanager Place and raised $3,842.

== History ==
AnimeIowa's first convention in 1997 was organized by the SFLIS Wing of Anime and Manga People (SWAMP). Technical issues occurred during the 2008 masquerade and some attendees rooms were relocated to a different hotel due to the Iowa flood of 2008. The 2011 convention occurred during the RAGBRAI bicycle ride. Cassandra Hodges was scheduled to attend the 2011 convention, but died on June 27, 2011. Iowa River Landing was used by both the RAGBRAI bicycle ride and AnimeIowa in 2015. AnimeIowa 2020 was cancelled due to the COVID-19 pandemic. The convention later held a virtual event in August.

=== Event history ===
Dates	Location	Atten.	Guests
September 19–21, 1997	Highlander Inn; Iowa City, Iowa	150 (estimate)	Steve Bennett and Kuni Kimura.
September 18–20, 1998	Highlander Inn; Iowa City, Iowa	300 (estimate)	Steve Bennett, Robert DeJesus, and Kuni Kimura.
September 3–5, 1999	Collins Plaza Hotel; Cedar Rapids, Iowa	420	Hiroshi Aro
September 1–3, 2000	Crowne Plaza Five Seasons Hotel; Cedar Rapids, Iowa	700 (estimate)	Steve Bennett, Robert DeJesus, Shimpei Itoh, and Toshifumi Yoshida.
August 24–26, 2001	Collins Plaza Hotel; Cedar Rapids, Iowa	900 (estimate)	Steve Bennett and Robert DeJesus
August 23–25, 2002	Collins Plaza Hotel & Convention Center; Cedar Rapids, Iowa		Steve Bennett, Robert DeJesus, Tiffany Grant, Lea Hernandez, and Stan Sakai.
August 22–24, 2003	Collins Plaza Hotel & Convention Center; Cedar Rapids, Iowa	1,608	Greg Ayres, Steve Bennett, Max Allen Collins, Robert DeJesus, Lea Hernandez, Jay Hickman, Kevin Lillard, Rob Mungle, and Jan Scott-Frazier.
September 17–19, 2004	Hotel Fort Des Moines; Des Moines, Iowa		Kia Asamiya, Greg Ayres, Ron Kaulfersch, Dr. Susan Napier, Monica Rial, and Mike Schwark.
September 9–11, 2005	Hotel Fort Des Moines; Des Moines, Iowa		Greg Ayres, Johnny Yong Bosch, Keith Burgess, Emily DeJesus, Robert DeJesus, Tricia Dickson, Bamboo Dong, Lea Hernandez, Taliesin Jaffe, Zarah Little, and Felipe Smith.
August 4–6, 2006	Crowne Plaza Hotel; Cedar Rapids, Iowa		Greg Ayres, Steve Bennett, Emily DeJesus, Robert DeJesus, Kyle Hebert, Lea Hernandez, Richard Kekahuna, Shawn Kleckner, Rob Mungle, and Carrie Savage.
August 10–12, 2007	Coralville Marriott Hotel & Conference Center; Coralville, Iowa		Christopher Ayres, Greg Ayres, Carrie Savage, Richard Torrance, Richard Townsend, and Shannon Townsend.
August 15–17, 2008	Coralville Marriott Hotel & Conference Center; Coralville, Iowa	2,468	Christopher Ayres, Greg Ayres, Clarine Harp, Kyle Hebert, Carrie Savage, Richard Townsend, and Shannon Townsend.
August 14–16, 2009	Coralville Marriott Hotel & Conference Center; Coralville, Iowa		Robert Axelrod, Greg Ayres, Emily DeJesus, Robert DeJesus, Michael McConnohie, Melodee M. Spevack, Richard Townsend, and Shannon Townsend.
July 30–August 1, 2010	Coralville Marriott Hotel & Conference Center; Coralville, Iowa	Attendance capped at 3,000	Christopher Ayres, Greg Ayres, Kyle Hebert, Cassandra Hodges, Helen McCarthy, Evan Miller, Richard Townsend, Shannon Townsend, and Maxey Whitehead.
July 29–31, 2011	Coralville Marriott Hotel & Conference Center; Coralville, Iowa	Attendance capped at 3,500	Robert Axelrod, Christopher Ayres, Greg Ayres, Jillian Coglan, Samurai Dan Coglan, Allie Dyal, Kyle Hebert, Lea Hernandez, Helen McCarthy, Carli Mosier, Steve Raffill, and Jan Scott-Frazier.
July 27–29, 2012	Coralville Marriott Hotel & Conference Center; Coralville, Iowa	3,000	Christopher Ayres, Greg Ayres, Johnny Yong Bosch, Svetlana Chmakova, Jillian Coglan, Samurai Dan Coglan, Patrick Delahanty, Terri Doty, Eyeshine, Jessie James Grelle, Stephen Hoff, Brittney Karbowski, and Chris "Kilika" Malone.
July 26–28, 2013	Coralville Marriott Hotel & Conference Center; Coralville, Iowa		Robert Axelrod, Greg Ayres, Jessie James Grelle, Chuck Huber, Trevor A. Mueller, Peter Pixie, Raj Ramayya, Mimiru Riley, Tyson Rinehart, Jad Saxton, Sarah "Sully" Sullivan, David Wald, and Young Wang.
July 25–27, 2014	Coralville Marriott Hotel & Conference Center; Coralville, Iowa		Robert Axelrod, Greg Ayres, Chris Cason, Jillian Coglan, Samurai Dan Coglan, Russell Lissau, Trevor A. Mueller, Mimiru Riley, Lucas Schuneman, Uncle Yo, and Greg Wicker.
July 24–26, 2015	Coralville Marriott Hotel & Conference Center; Coralville, Iowa		Greg Ayres, Caitlynn French, Briana Lawrence, Andrew Love, Chris "Kilika" Malone, Carli Mosier, Trevor A. Mueller, Peter Pixie, Steve Raffill, Xero Reynolds, Micah Solusod, Paul St. Peter, Brooke Stephenson, Alexis Tipton, Jessica Walsh, and Shinichi Watanabe.
July 29–31, 2016	Coralville Marriott Hotel & Conference Center; Coralville, Iowa		Greg Ayres, Steve Bennett, Steve Blum, Chris Cason, Fredd Gorham, Kyle Hebert, Chris "Kilika" Malone, Trevor A. Mueller, The Pillowcases, Spike Spencer, Paul St. Peter, Brooke Stephenson, Doug Walker, Shinichi Watanabe.
July 28-30, 2017	Coralville Marriott Hotel & Conference Center; Coralville, Iowa		Greg Ayres, Steve Bennett, Jillian Coglan, Samurai Dan Coglan, Fredd Gorham, Briana Lawrence, Russell Lissau, Chris "Kilika" Malone, Jessica Walsh, and Lisle Wilkerson.
July 13-15, 2018	Iowa Events Center; Des Moines, Iowa		Greg Ayres, Chris Bevins, Jillian Coglan, Samurai Dan Coglan, Joel McDonald, Daniel Mohr, Trina Nishimura, The Pillowcases, Rachel Robinson, and Austin Tindle.
July 12-14, 2019	Iowa Events Center; Des Moines, Iowa		Greg Ayres, Morgan Berry, Crusher-P, Kohei Hattori, IA, Lauren Landa, Matthew Lassiter, Daniel Mohr, J. Michael Tatum, TiA, Vedetta Marie, and Sarah Wiedenheft.
July 30 - August 1, 2021	Coralville Marriott Hotel & Conference Center; Coralville, Iowa		Brian Beacock and Steve Prince.
July 22-24, 2022	Hyatt Regency Coralville Hotel & Conference Center; Coralville, Iowa		Steve Prince
July 28-30, 2023	Hyatt Regency Coralville Hotel & Conference Center; Coralville, Iowa		Samurai Dan Coglan
July 26-28, 2024	Hyatt Regency Coralville Hotel & Conference Center; Coralville, Iowa		Corina Boettger, Sean Chiplock, The Shake Ups, and Michael "Knightmage" Wilson.
July 25-27, 2025	Hyatt Regency Coralville Hotel & Conference Center; Coralville, Iowa	2,300 (est.)	Mark Allen, Jr., Aaron Dismuke, Derick Snow, Austin Tindle, and Sarah Wiedenheft.
July 31 - August 2, 2026	Hyatt Regency Coralville Hotel & Conference Center; Coralville, Iowa		Brian Beacock, Steve Bennett, Samurai Dan Coglan, The Kamikaze Snowmen, Patrick Pedraza, Carrie Savage, and Chris Tergliafera.
