= ICON (blockchain platform) =

ICX
Denominations
- Code: ICX

Development
- Original author: Min Kim
- Initial release: January 2018
- Development status: Active
- Developer(s): ICON Foundation, ICONLOOP

Ledger
- Timestamping scheme: Delegated proof-of-stake
- Block time: 2 seconds
- Block explorer: https://tracker.icon.community/

Website
- Website: https://icon.foundation

ICON is a decentralized, open-source blockchain with smart contract functionality. ICX is the native cryptocurrency of the platform.

== History ==
ICON was founded in 2017 by Min Kim of the Switzerland-based ICON Foundation. According to the official ICON white paper, the purpose for ICON was to introduce a new era of decentralization and hyper connect Korea.

ICON's initial coin offering (ICO) in September 2017 raised 150,000 ETH (approximately US$43 million at the time).

At the time of launch, ICON was supported by various public and private organizations, including the Seoul Metropolitan Government in South Korea, and the Line Corporation in Japan.

== Applications ==
=== Decentralized finance ===
Decentralized finance (DeFi) is a use case of ICON. It offers traditional financial instruments in a decentralized architecture, outside of companies' and governments' control, such as money market funds which let users earn interest. Decentralized finance applications can be accessed through a Web3-enabled browser extension or application, which allows users to directly interact with the ICON blockchain through a website. Many of these decentralized applications (also known as dapps) can connect and work together to create complex financial services.

=== Non-fungible tokens (NFTs) ===
ICON allows for the creation of non-fungible tokens (NFTs). Since tokens of this type are unique, they have been used to represent such things as collectibles, digital art, sports memorabilia, virtual real estate, and items within games. Land, buildings, and avatars in blockchain-based virtual worlds can also be bought and sold as NFTs.

== See also ==
- List of cryptocurrencies
- Bitcoin
- Decentralized finance
