= Symphony of the Seas =

Oasis-class cruise ship

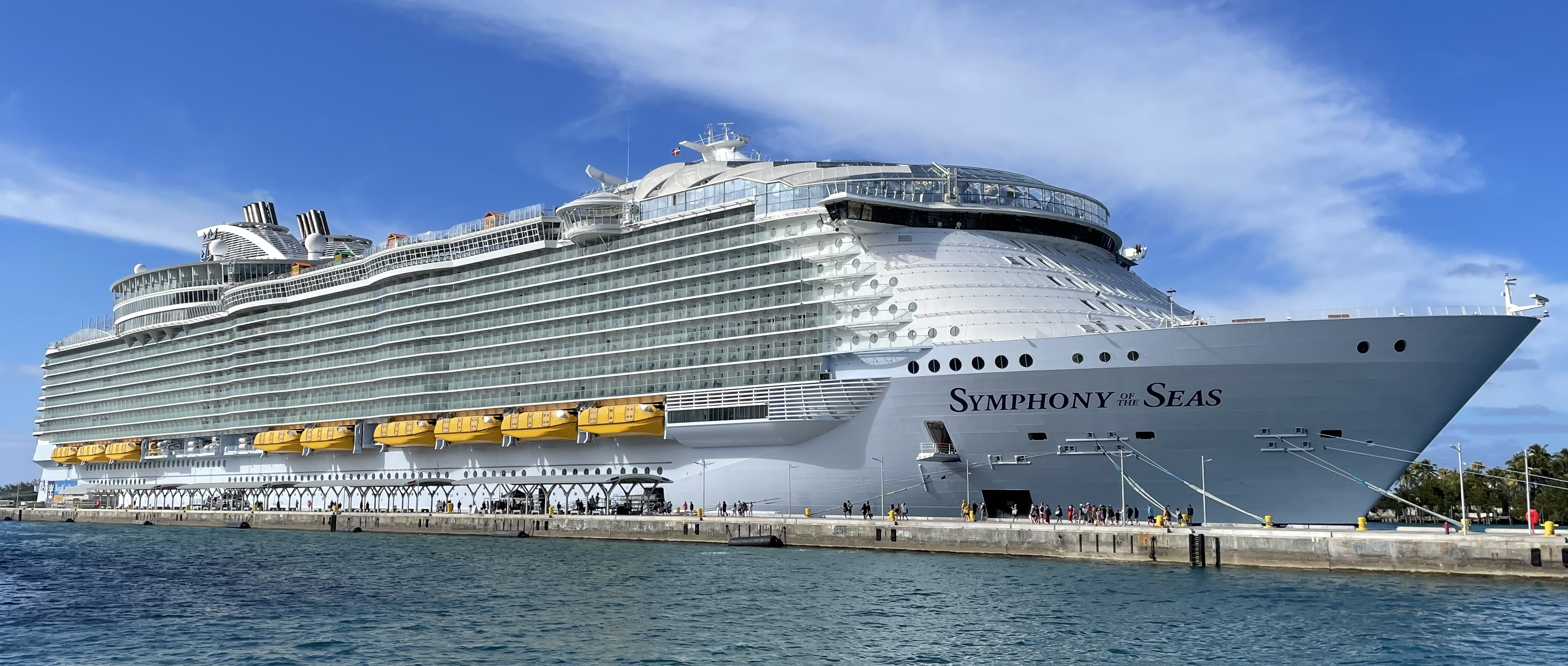
- Symphony of the Seas in Nassau on 9 February 2024

History

Bahamas
- Name: Symphony of the Seas
- Owner: Royal Caribbean Group
- Operator: Royal Caribbean International
- Port of registry: Nassau, Bahamas
- Route: Caribbean
- Ordered: 9 May 2014
- Builder: Chantiers de l'Atlantique, Saint-Nazaire, France
- Cost: US$1.35 billion (2016)
- Yard number: B34
- Laid down: 29 October 2015
- Launched: 9 June 2017 (float-out)
- Sponsored by: Carlos, Alexa, and Ocean PenaVega
- Completed: 23 March 2018
- Acquired: 23 March 2018
- Maiden voyage: 7 April 2018
- In service: 2018–present
- Home port: PortMiami
- Identification: Call sign: C6DF6; IMO number: 9744001; MMSI number: 311000660; DNV ID: 34719
- Status: In service

General characteristics
- Class & type: Oasis-class cruise ship
- Tonnage: 228,081 GT; 258,794 NT; 18,095 DWT
- Length: 361.8 m (1,187 ft 0 in)
- Beam: 47.448 m (155 ft 8.0 in) waterline; 66 m (215.5 ft) max beam
- Height: 72.5 m (238 ft)
- Draught: 9.322 m (30 ft 7.0 in)
- Decks: 18
- Installed power: 3 × 14.4 MW (19,300 hp) Wärtsilä 12V46D; 3 × 19.2 MW (25,700 hp) Wärtsilä 16V46D
- Propulsion: Diesel-electric; 3 × 20 MW (27,000 hp) ABB Azipod, all azimuthing; 4 × 5.5 MW (7,400 hp) Wärtsilä WTT-55; bow thrusters
- Speed: 22 knots (41 km/h; 25 mph) cruising
- Capacity: 5,518 passengers at double occupancy; 6,680 passengers maximum
- Crew: 2,200
- Notes: World's largest cruise ship from March 2018–January 2022

Symphony of the Seas is an Oasis-class cruise ship owned and operated by Royal Caribbean International. She was built in 2018 in the Chantiers de l'Atlantique shipyard in Saint-Nazaire, France, the fourth in Royal Caribbean's Oasis class of cruise ships.

At 228,081 GT, she was the largest cruise ship in the world by gross tonnage when built, surpassing her sister ship Harmony of the Seas, also owned by Royal Caribbean International, and surpassed by her sister ship Wonder of the Seas in 2022.

== Description and design ==
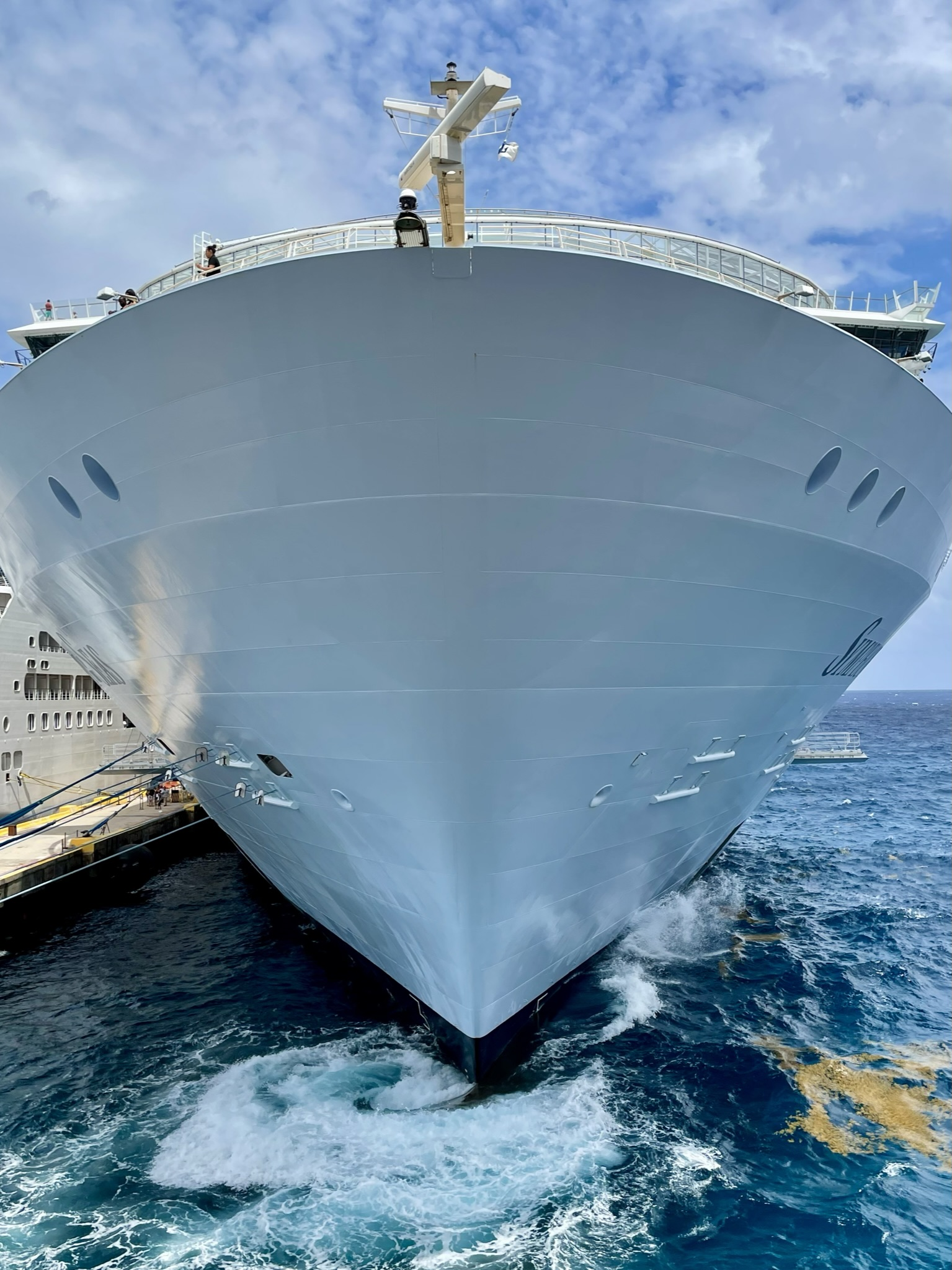
Symphony of the Seas at Costa Maya, Mexico

Symphony of the Seas measures 361.011 metres (1,184 ft 5.0 in) in length and has a gross tonnage of 228,081 across 18 decks. She can accommodate 5,518 passengers at double occupancy up to a maximum capacity of 6,680 passengers, as well as a 2,200-person crew. There are 16 decks for guest use, 22 restaurants, 4 pools and 2,759 cabins.

Symphony of the Seas is about 30 metres (98 ft) longer than the largest military ships ever built, the U.S. Nimitz-class aircraft carriers.

=== Features ===
Facilities include a children's water park, a full-size basketball court, an ice-skating rink, a zip line that is 10 decks high, a 1,400-seat theater, an outdoor aquatic theater with Olympic-height platforms, and two 43-foot (13 m) rock-climbing walls. There is also a park containing over 20,000 tropical plants.

Symphony of the Seas is powered onboard by six marine-diesel sets composed of three 16-cylinder Wärtsilä 16V46D common rail engines and three 12-cylinder Wärtsilä 12V46D engines.

The energy-efficient design of Symphony of the Seas requires less shipboard power generation, with 85 MW versus the 100 MW normally found on Oasis-class ships. One of the key design features is the use of only LED or fluorescent lights in order to avoid the heat generation from incandescent bulbs, thereby reducing the load on air conditioning systems. Additional energy efficiency is accomplished by using a 2 MW steam turbine to recover waste heat from the engines and converting it into energy to power a portion of the onboard hotel load.

For propulsion, Symphony of the Seas uses three 20 MW azipod main engines, which are electric thrusters. These engines are mounted under the stern of the ship and they each drive 6.1-metre (20 ft)-wide rotatable propellers. In addition to the three main engines, there are four bow thrusters used for docking, each with 5.5 MW of power or 7,380 horsepower.

Among the Oasis-class ships, Symphony of the Seas uses 25% less fuel due to design changes. One of these is the implementation of a new system that releases tiny air bubbles under the hull to enable the vessel to glide more smoothly through the water. The air layer also reduces excitation from the propellers, which cuts noise and vibration levels in the aft part of the ship.

== Construction and career ==
On 29 October 2015, the vessel's keel was laid by the Chantiers de l'Atlantique shipyard in Saint-Nazaire, France. Symphony of the Seas floated out on 9 June 2017. Actors Alexa Vega and Carlos Pena Jr., and their 23-month-old son Ocean were chosen as the "Godfamily" of the ship, marking the first time in the industry that a family was a ship sponsor. The christening ceremony took place in Miami in November 2018.

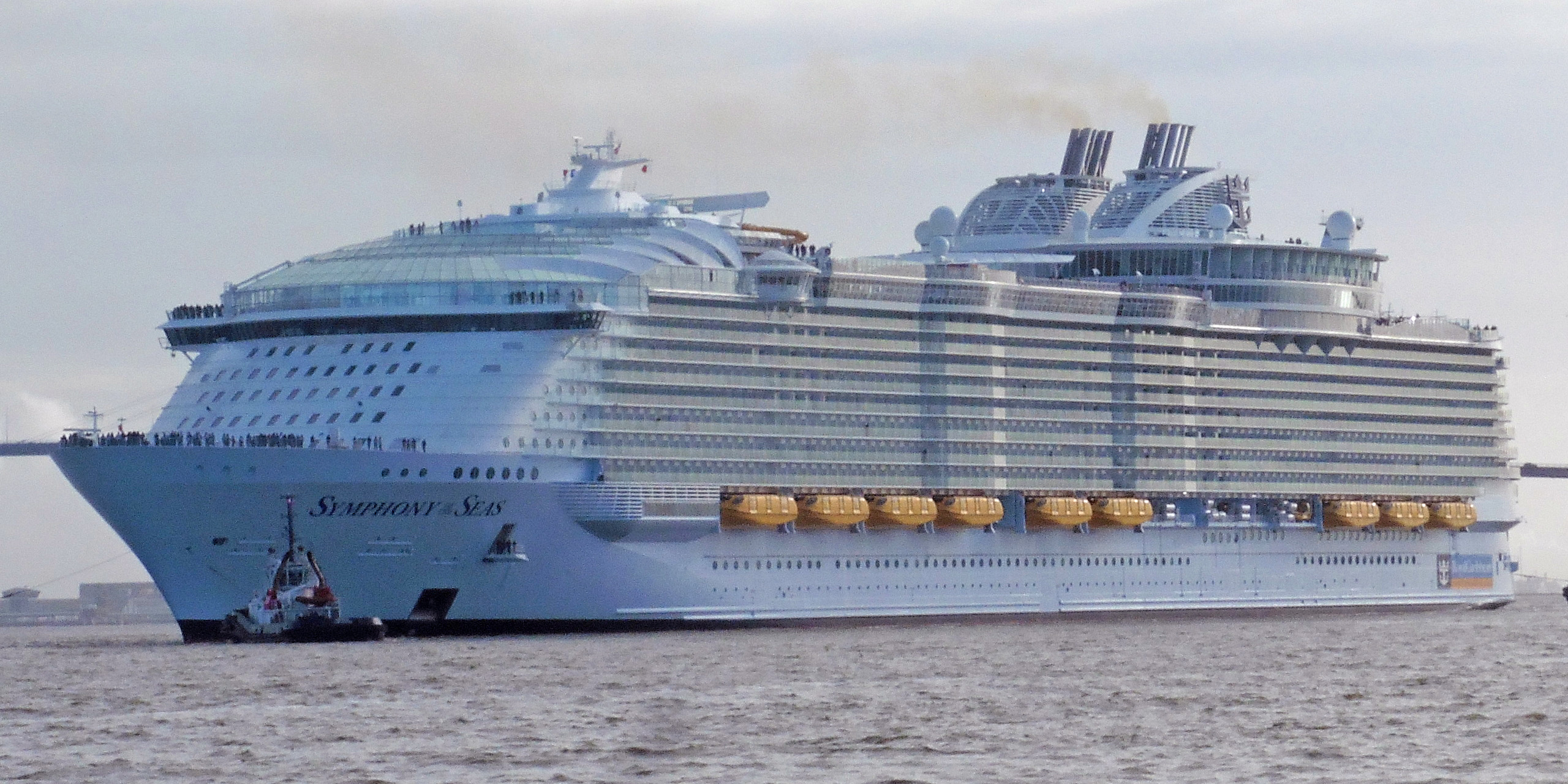
Symphony of the Seas in Saint-Nazaire after her completion

From 15 to 18 February 2018, the cruise ship underwent sea trials and was formally turned over to Royal Caribbean International on 23 March. On 24 March, the ship left Saint-Nazaire for Málaga under the command of Rob Hempstead, arriving on 27 March, and arrived at the vessel's first homeport of Barcelona, Spain on 29 March.

=== First sailing ===
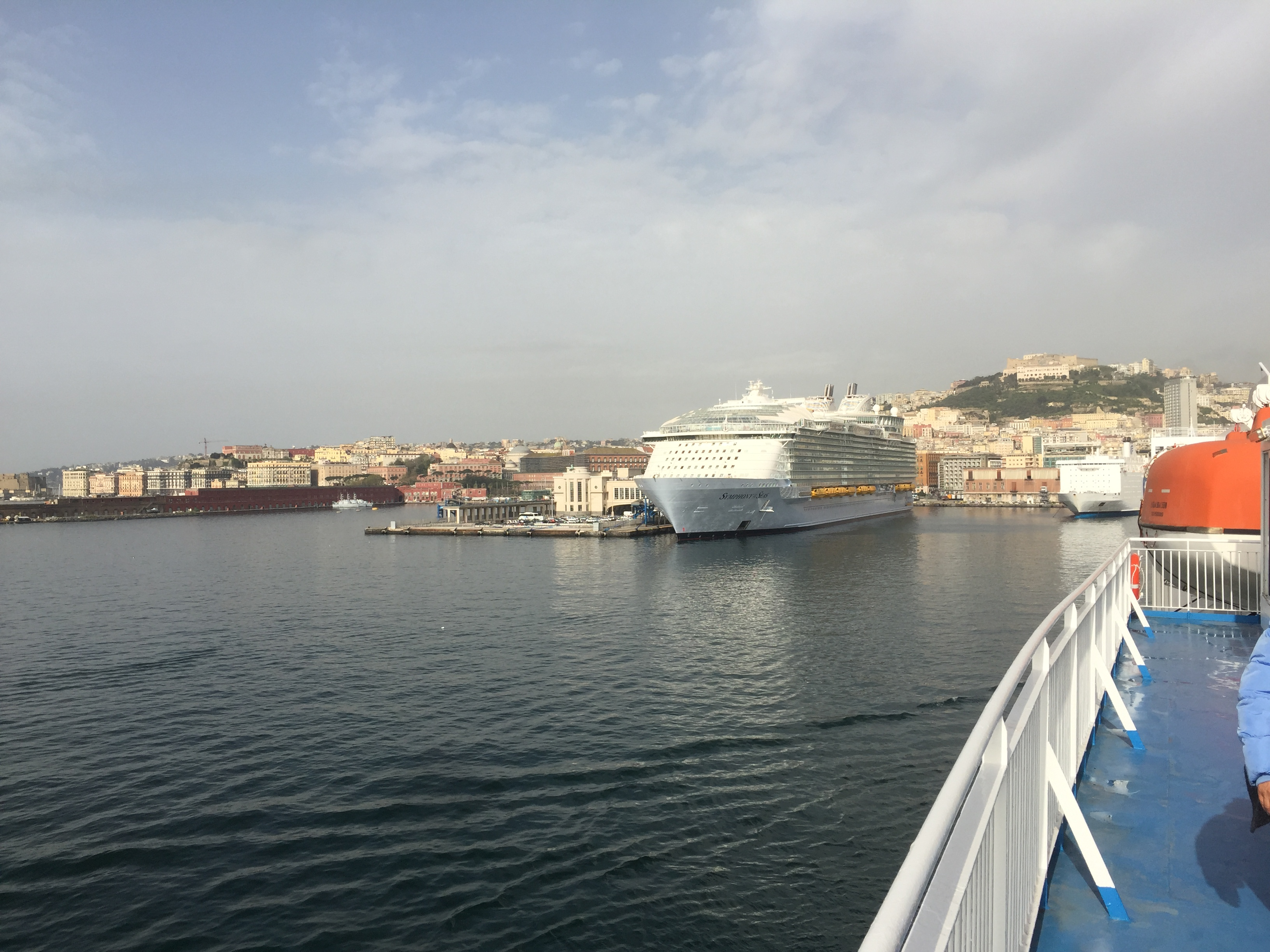
Symphony of the Seas in Naples, Italy

On 31 March 2018, Symphony of the Seas offered her first passenger cruise and began her maiden voyage on 7 April for a week-long trip through the Mediterranean.

During her first season, Symphony of the Seas continued to sail on seven-night Western Mediterranean cruises from Barcelona. She re-positioned on 28 October and arrived on 9 November at her new home port at the Royal Caribbean terminal at PortMiami in Florida, United States to provide cruises of the Caribbean.

=== COVID-19 pandemic ===
During the COVID-19 pandemic on cruise ships, Royal Caribbean suspended all services across most of its fleet, including Symphony of the Seas. A 27-year old crew member from the housekeeping department was medically evacuated in March 2020 and subsequently died from COVID-19 in April 2020. The family later sued Royal Caribbean for wrongful death.

In 2020, Channel 4 in the United Kingdom aired a behind-the-scenes show featuring Symphony of the Seas called Billion Pound Cruise. The three-part series was filmed at the end of 2019 and covers the on-board experiences.

== Incidents ==
- In January 2019, while the ship was docked in Nassau, Bahamas, a guest jumped overboard as part of a stunt and survived. He and his friends were turned over to law enforcement but were not charged, and they were required to return home at their own expense. Subsequently, Royal Caribbean announced that it would permanently ban the guests from sailing on any of its ships.
- In August 2019, an Australian passenger died after going overboard during a seven-day cruise of the Caribbean. His body was recovered shortly afterwards by the ship's officials.
- On October 29, 2023, while repositioning the ship from Barcelona to Florida for the winter season, a passenger went overboard. The crew successfully rescued the downed passenger.
