= Port Everglades =

Seaport in Broward County, Florida

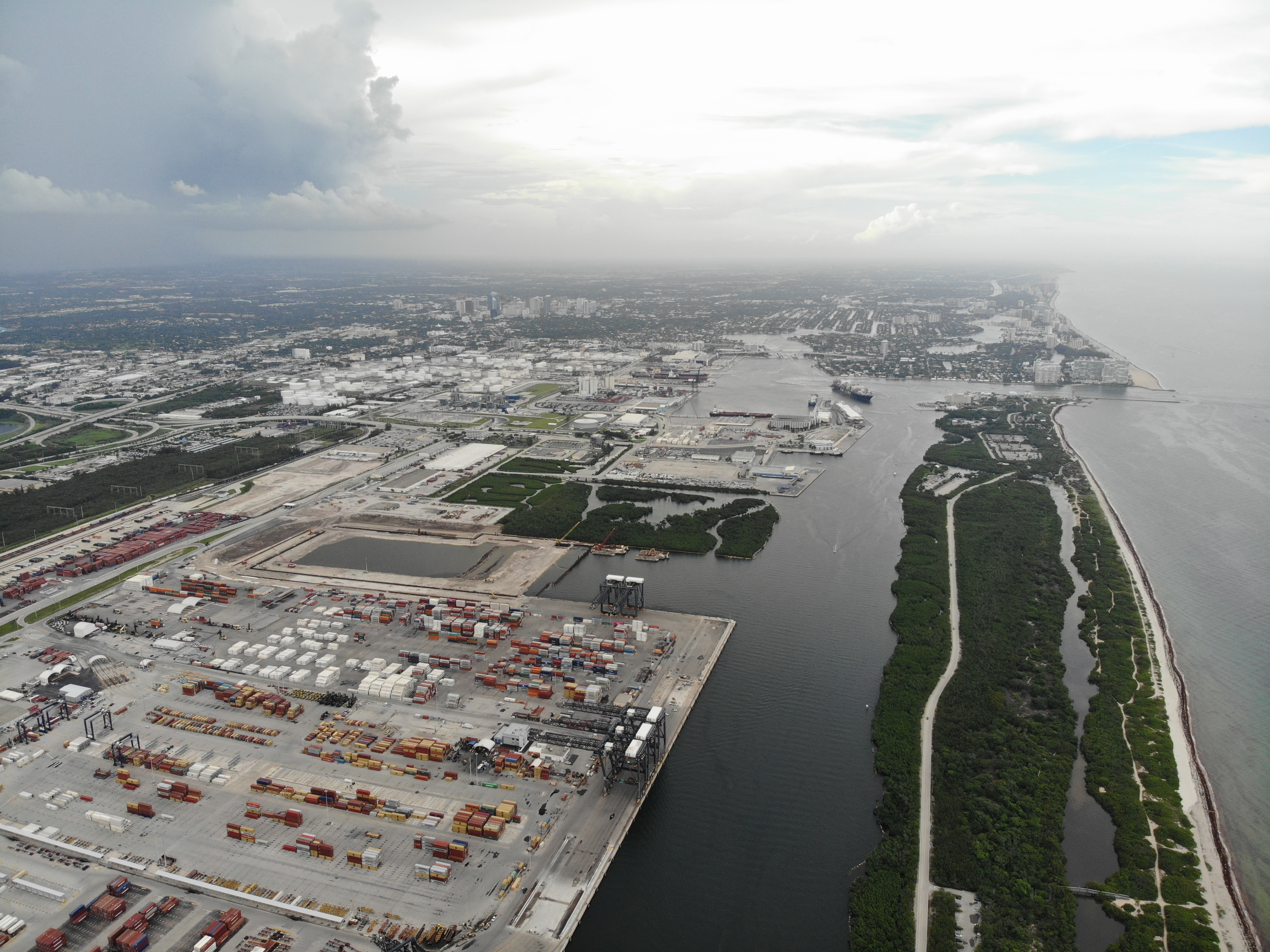
- Aerial shot of Port Everglades
- Interactive map of Port Everglades
- Location within the United States

Location
- Country: United States
- Location: Broward County, Florida
- Coordinates: 26°5′10″N 80°6′55″W
- UN/LOCODE: USPEF

Details
- Opened: February 22, 1928; 98 years ago
- Owned by: Broward County
- Type of Harbor: Natural/Artificial
- No. of berths: 44
- Draft depth: 44 feet (13 m)
- Chief Executive Officer/Port Director: Jonathan Daniels

Statistics
- Vessel arrivals: ▲5,251 (FY25)
- Annual container volume: ▲1,167,552 TEUs (FY25)
- Passenger traffic: ▲4,773,873 (FY25)
- Annual revenue: ▲US$235.6 million (FY25)
- Net income: ▲US$$103.7 million (FY25)
- Website www.porteverglades.net

Port Everglades is a seaport in Fort Lauderdale, Florida. Opened on February 22, 1928, and owned by Broward County, the port handles both cargo and passenger traffic and supports cruise operations, international trade, and petroleum distribution in South Florida.

Port Everglades is among the world’s busiest cruise ports. In fiscal year 2025, the port handled approximately 4,773,873 cruise passengers, ranking it as the fourth busiest cruise port globally by passenger volume. In addition to passenger operations, Port Everglades supports a large cargo operation. During fiscal year 2025, the port handled approximately 1,167,552 twenty-foot equivalent units (TEUs) of containerized cargo. It is also a major Florida seaport for petroleum products, including gasoline and jet fuel, serving as a distribution point for refined fuels across South Florida. In total, during fiscal year 2025, the port recorded 5,251 vessel arrivals.

Port Everglades is operated by the Port Everglades Department, a self-supporting enterprise fund of Broward County that does not rely on local property taxes. In fiscal year 2025, the port reported operating revenues of US$235.6 million and net income of US$103.7 million.

== History ==
Port Everglades is composed of land within three municipalities, Hollywood, Fort Lauderdale and Dania Beach and unincorporated Broward County. Port Everglades is a man-made seaport. The port was originally dredged from Lake Mabel, a natural body of water that was a wide and shallow section of the Florida East Coast Canal system. In 1911, the Florida Board of Trade passed a resolution that called for a deep-water port. The port was originally intended to ship produce to the North and the West. In 1913, the Fort Lauderdale Harbor Company was formed and eventually dug out the Lake Mabel Cut, which opened the New River to the sea and created access for small boats.

In 1924, the founder and mayor of the city of Hollywood, Florida, Joseph Wesley Young, bought 1,440 acres (5.8 km^{2}) of land adjacent to the lake. He then created the Hollywood Harbor Development Company. Three years later, the Florida Legislature established the Broward County Port Authority. On February 22, 1928, 85 percent of Broward County's residents gathered for a ceremony in which President Calvin Coolidge was to push a button from the White House detonating explosives to remove the rock barrier separating the harbor from the Atlantic Ocean. The button malfunctioned, but the barrier was removed shortly thereafter.

Bay Mabel Harbor was dedicated on February 22, 1928. Many of South Florida's local women's clubs agreed that the port needed a new name to better represent the region. They held a name changing contest, and the name Port Everglades was selected. The reason for this was as follows: "The gateway to the rich agricultural area embraced in the 4,000,000 acres (1,600,000 hectares) at the Port's very backdoor." The container handling capacity of the port was increased with a new 41 acres (17 hectares) terminal, completed in 2010. The expansion increased Port Everglades' freight handling area by 15%.

In 2015, the US Army Corps of Engineers approved a new phase of expansion for Port Everglades with the deepening and widening of the port's channels. The project received federal authorization in December 2016 under the Water Infrastructure Improvements for the Nation (WIIN) Act. The port served ships from Europe and South America that were too large to fit through the Panama Canal, but the ships still had to be under a certain load to fit properly in the port. The expansion was planned to increase main navigational channels from 42 feet (13 meters) to 50 feet (15 m), and to deepen and widen both the Entrance Channel and parts of the Intracoastal Waterway. The project was planned to be completed in 2028, create approximately 4,789 construction jobs and 1,491 direct jobs locally, and cost $509.6 million. In February 2020, the port received $29.1 million from Congress for the Intracoastal Waterway portion of the expansion; a section of the Waterway would be widened by 250 feet and be completed by 2023. The remaining funds, estimated up to $437 million, is expected to arrive at the end of 2021 and fund the deepening portion of the project, now scheduled to be completed between 2024 and 2026.

In May 2017, Port Everglades received approval to begin the Southport Turning Notch Extension (STNE) project, its largest capital improvement project in the Port's history. The existing deepwater turn-around area would be lengthened by 1,500 feet, from 900 feet to 2,400 feet. The lengthening makes it possible for up to five new cargo ship berths to be added. Additionally, existing gantry crane rails will be extended, and three new super-post-Panamax container gantry cranes were manufactured to supplement the expansion. The STNE also replaced 8.7 acres of an existing mangrove conservation easement with a 16.5-acre mangrove upland easement. In June 2017, Port Everglades received approval to purchase the three new gantry cranes and in June 2018, Port Everglades Chief Executive Steven Cernak gave the approval to begin manufacturing three "Super Post-Panamax" gantry cranes to increase the port's cargo volume. Each crane, manufactured by ZPMC, cost $13.8 million, and measures 175 feet tall. They were expected to arrive in 2020.

== Passenger operations ==
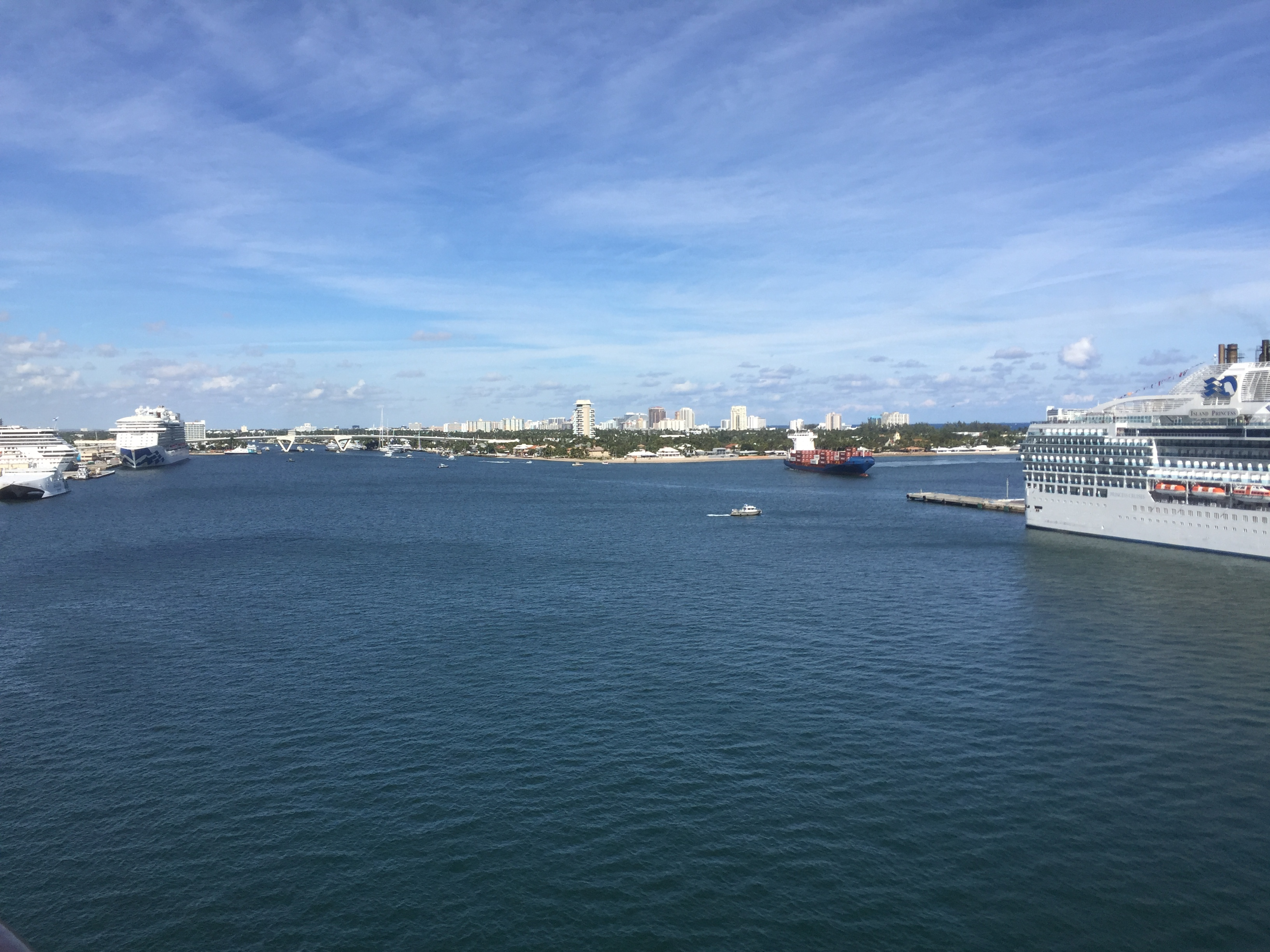
View from on board a cruise ship

=== Cruise ships ===
Port Everglades is one of the world's busiest cruise ports. The port serves major cruise companies, Carnival Corporation & plc, Disney Cruise Line and Royal Caribbean Group. In fiscal year 2025, Port Everglades ranked as the fourth busiest cruise port in the world by passenger volume, handling 4,773,873 passengers.

=== Ferry ===
Baleària operates a high speed catamaran passenger ferry service between Port Everglades and Bimini or Freeport in The Bahamas, using the HSC Jaume II.

==== Current passenger terminals ====
Terminal	Primary allocation
2	Carnival Corporation
4	Disney Cruise Line
18	Royal Caribbean Group
19	Carnival Corporation
21	Baleària and Carnival Corporation
25	Royal Caribbean Group
26	Carnival Corporation
29	Royal Caribbean Group and Carnival Corporation

== Impact and recognition ==
=== Influence on Broward County ===
Port Everglades has a large economic impact on Broward County. In FY2019, the Port generated over $32 billion in economic activity and more than 219,000 statewide jobs. As the third-busiest cruise homeport in the world, it directly affects the region's tourism industry, with more than 3.89 million cruise passengers arriving in 2019 According to a 2015 study, 62% of surveyed passengers stayed in South Florida for at least a night prior to their cruise and 21% arrived at their cruise directly from Fort Lauderdale–Hollywood International Airport. 21% of surveyed passengers stayed in South Florida after their cruise.

In Fiscal Year 2022, Port Everglades generated over $33 billion in business activity. The port also generated over 216,000 jobs throughout the state of Florida. This resulted in a total of $809,333 taxes collected on the state and local level. In 2017, Port Everglades was also ranked America's second-largest port for exports to Cuba, behind Port of Brunswick in Georgia.

Condominium residents who live in buildings next to the channel of Port Everglades often bid bon voyage to cruise ships as they embark on their voyages from Port Everglades with the "Condo Salute". The residents blow horns, ring bells, or wave scarves, and the ships often respond by blowing their horns back.

=== Notable ships ===
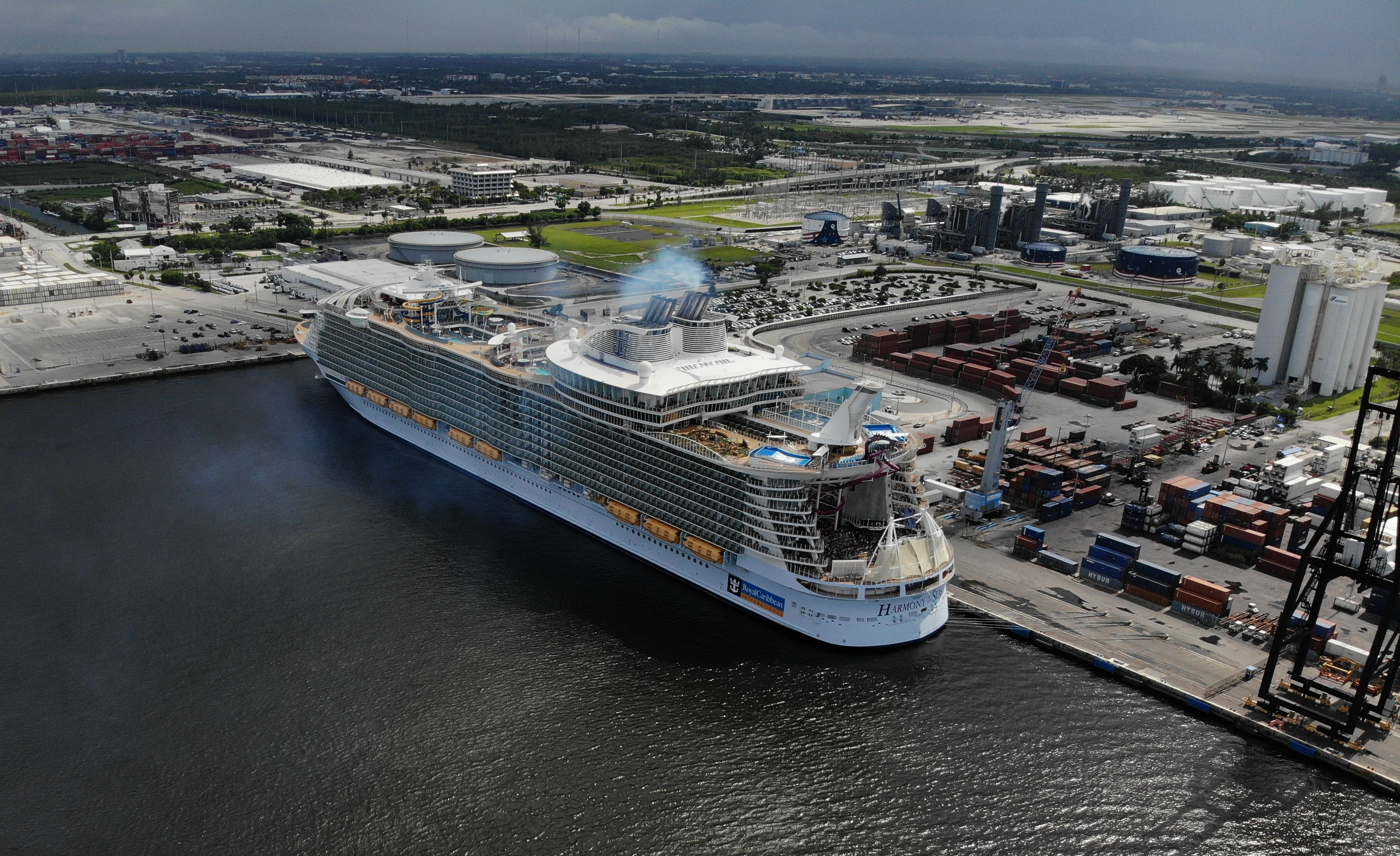
Harmony of the Seas docked at Port Everglades

Ships sail from Port Everglades year-round, but the peak season for cruise travel from Port Everglades is from November to April, with most itineraries sailing to the Caribbean. Port Everglades was once home to RMS Queen Elizabeth when she was laid up as a museum ship from 1968 until 1970. Besides RMS Queen Elizabeth, Port Everglades has been used to dock many notable and famous ships. In 2004, Queen Mary 2 completed her maiden voyage and her maiden transatlantic voyage at Port Everglades.

In the 21st century, Port Everglades has been the homeports for four of one of the largest passenger ships in the world, the Oasis-class ships. In December 2009, Royal Caribbean International began using Port Everglades as the home port for Oasis of the Seas. In late 2010, she was joined at Port Everglades by her sister ship, Allure of the Seas. In April 2017, Port Everglades became the homeport for Harmony of the Seas from April 2017 until May 2019. and in 2022 the Wonder of the Seas made her debut sailing from Port Everglades.

In November 2018, Celebrity Edge performed her maiden call at Port Everglades. In anticipation of her arrival, Port Everglades invested $120 million into the port's first-ever brand-designed cruise terminal at Terminal 25, the largest investment that Port Everglades has made towards any cruise terminal at the port. With this development, it is expected that Celebrity Cruises will bring about 500,000 travelers to Port Everglades.

Disney Cruise Line's second homeport was chosen at Port Everglades' Terminal 4. The terminal exclusively serves Disney Cruise Line ships, with the Disney Magic currently homeported there. The terminal's exterior design is based on Disney's original homeport at Port Canaveral, while the interior features a Finding Nemo theme. This port began embarking guests on November 20, 2023.

=== Records and achievements ===
Seatrade Insider named Port Everglades "World's Top Cruise Port" for 2010. Between 2009 and 2016, Port Everglades was named Best U.S. Homeport by Porthole Cruise Magazine several times.

Port Everglades' growth has also been marked in a series of world record for most cruise passengers in a single day. On December 21, 2003, the port hosted a world record of 15 cruise ships, processing 44,108 passengers. On March 20, 2010, there were 53,365 passengers. On December 20, 2015, there were 53,485 passengers. On March 13, 2016, there were 55,885 passengers. On December 1, 2019, there were 55,964 passengers.

== Timeline ==
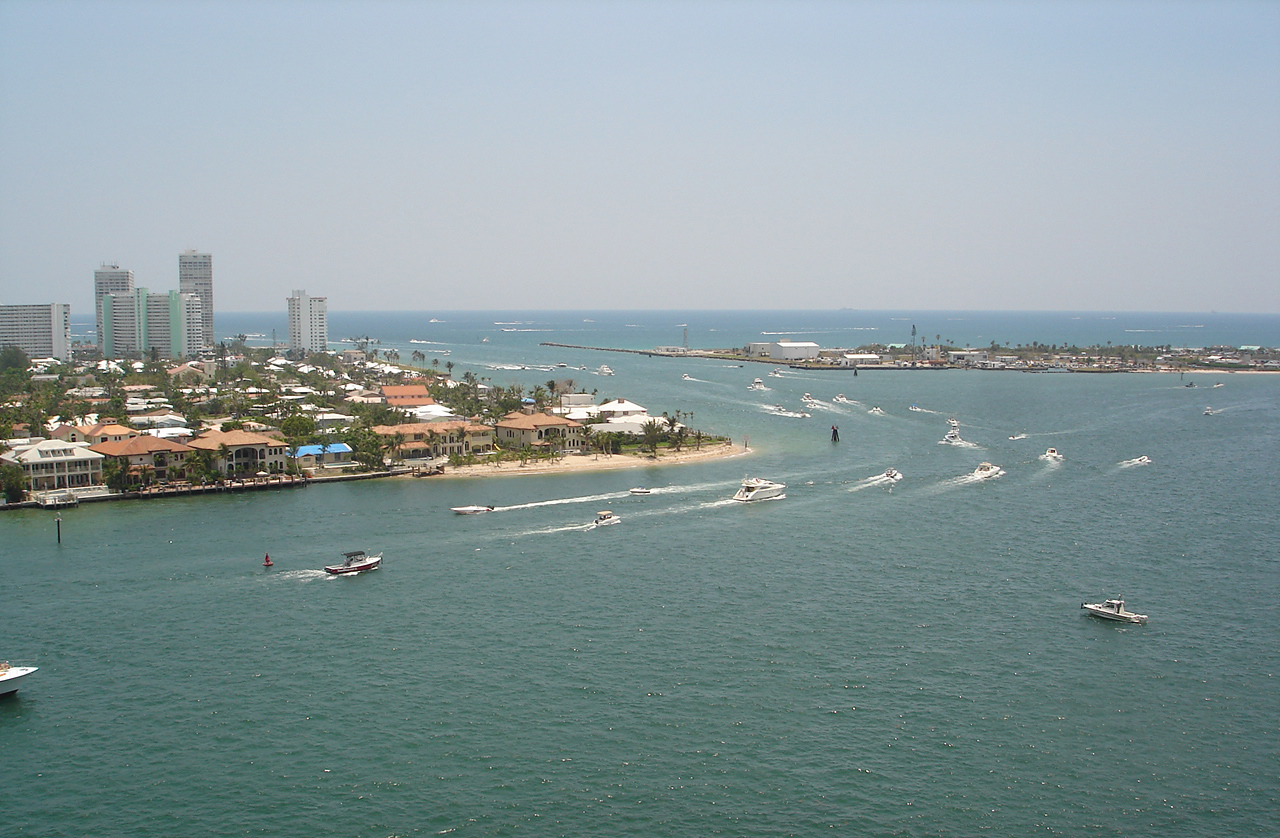
Port Everglades looking southeast towards entrance channel.

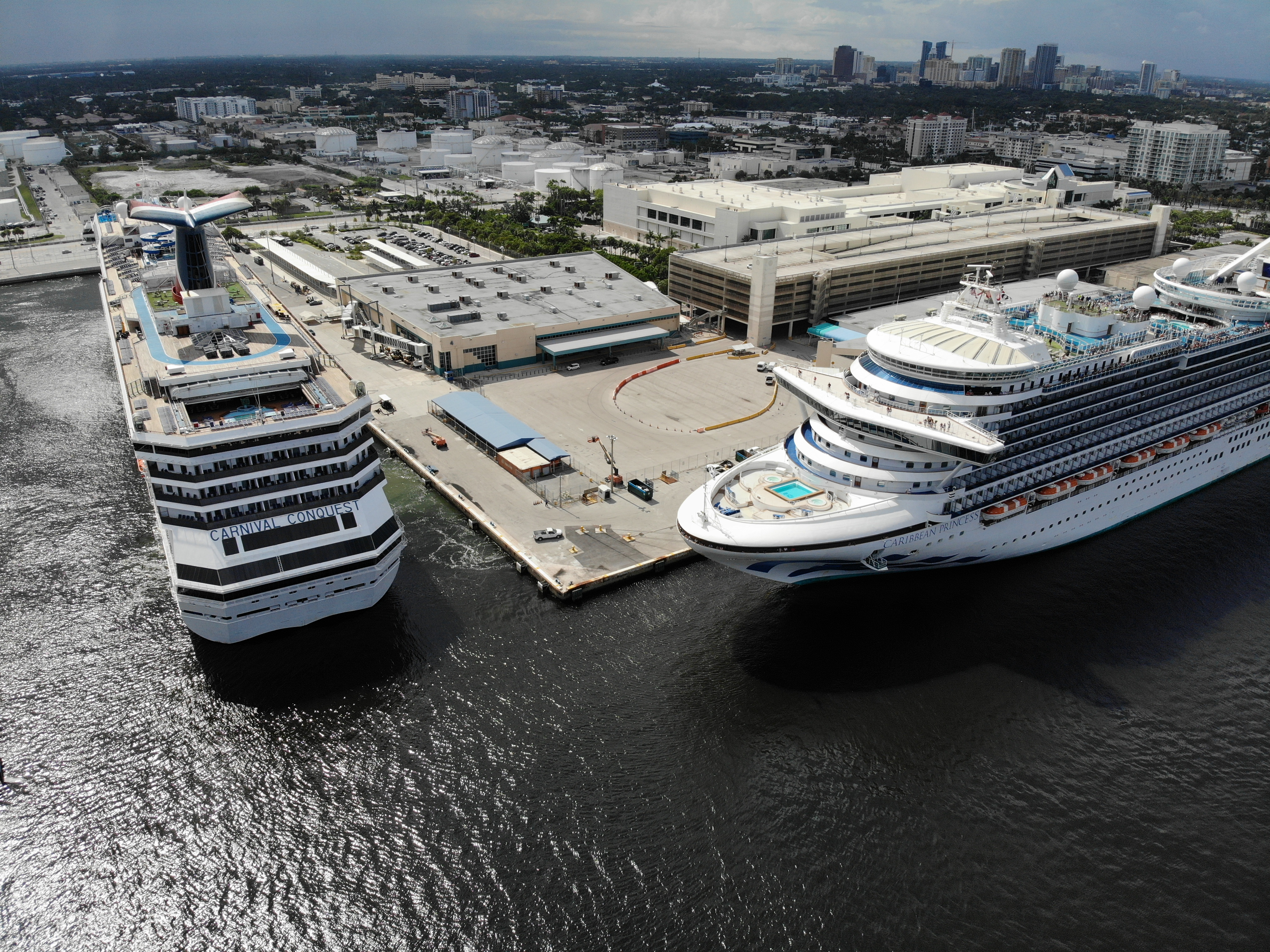
An aerial shot of the stern of Carnival Conquest and the bow of Caribbean Princess both docked at Port Everglades.

- In 1911, the Florida Board of Trade passed a resolution calling for a deep-water port to ship farmers' produce to the North and West.
- In 1913, the Fort Lauderdale Harbor Company was formed and eventually dug out the Lake Mabel Cut, opening the New River to the sea for small boats.
- In 1924, Joseph Wesley Young, founder and mayor of the city of Hollywood, bought 1,440 acres of land adjacent to the lake and created Hollywood Harbor Development Company.
- In 1926, Young helped get a $2 million harbor improvement bond measure overwhelmingly passed by voters in Hollywood and Fort Lauderdale.
- In 1927, the Florida State Legislature establishes the Broward County Port Authority.
- On February 22, 1928, 85 percent of Broward County's residents gathered for a ceremony in which President Calvin Coolidge was to push a button from the White House detonating explosives to remove the rock barrier separating the harbor from the ocean. Nothing happened, but the barrier was removed shortly thereafter.
- In 1928, Port Everglades was named through a contest conducted by several area women's groups.
- In 1929, Fort Lauderdale dedicated its first airport. That same year, the Port project was completed and the Port obtained certificates for construction of a railway connecting the Port to the Florida East Coast Railway.
- In 1929, the SS Vogtland became the first cargo ship and first foreign-flagged vessel to enter Port Everglades.
- In 1931, Port Everglades welcomed United Fruit Co., as the port's first official cruise line.
- In 1931, Aeroland Oil Co. is the first petroleum company to enter into an agreement for land and pipeline easements. Belcher (Coastal Fuels), Standard Oil (Chevron) and American Oil (Amoco) follow suit.
- 1941-1943, Port Everglades is used as a military base for the U.S. Navy.
- The 1940s saw a burgeoning military presence and the 1950s brought cruise liners from around the world to the Port. Around that time, the Fort Lauderdale Rotary Club began greeting ships with Florida orange juice. The tradition continued for 20 years.
- 1960s: The Broward County Port Authority was renamed the Port Everglades Authority and the site of the future Southport cargo terminal was purchased.
- 1970s: The Port became the center of Florida's first Foreign trade zone.
- 1980s: The Port purchased its first rail-mounted container gantry crane.
- 1990s: The Greater Fort Lauderdale/Broward County Convention Center opened at Northport, two parking garages were completed and on November 22, 1994, Port Everglades' governance was transferred from the Port Authority to the Broward County government.
- In 1994, Port Everglades becomes an enterprise fund governed by Broward County.
- 2000s: Port Everglades continuously breaks its own world record for handling the most cruise passengers.
- In 2001, Port Everglades dedicated a new Operations Center and Harbormaster Tower constructed atop the Midport Parking Garage. Port Everglades also celebrated its 70th cruise season hosting the world's largest collection of five star ships.
- In 2003, on February 28, port users and customers celebrated the 75th Anniversary of Port Everglades.
- In 2004, Port Everglades greeted the Queen. Cunard Line's Queen Mary 2, the world's largest ocean liner, as she made her first visit to mainland U.S. from the UK, by arriving at Port Everglades, her U.S. winter home port. QM2 is the longest, widest, tallest and most expensive ocean liner ever built.
- In 2009, Port Everglades opened the World's Largest Cruise Terminal and home of Royal Caribbean's 5,400-passenger Oasis of the Seas, the largest cruise ship in the world at the time.
- In 2010, Oasis of the Seas was joined by Allure of the Seas, making Port Everglades home to the two largest cruise ships in the world.
- In March 2011, the Broward County Board of County Commissioners approved an update of the Port's 20-Year Master/Vision Plan that includes key cargo expansion projects over the next six years that will add five berths, widen and deepen the channel to 50 feet (15 m) and bring freight rail into the port.
- In 2012, Port Everglades was the first port in Florida to join the Green Marine program, which helps ports meet various standards to improve environmental impact and reduce the footprint of the port.
- In 2015, Port Everglades was approved for expansion by the US Army Corps of Engineers.
- In March 2016, Port Everglades broke the Guinness World Record for number of cruisers in a day at 55,885.

== See also ==
- United States container ports
