= Utopia of the Seas =

Oasis-class Cruise ship

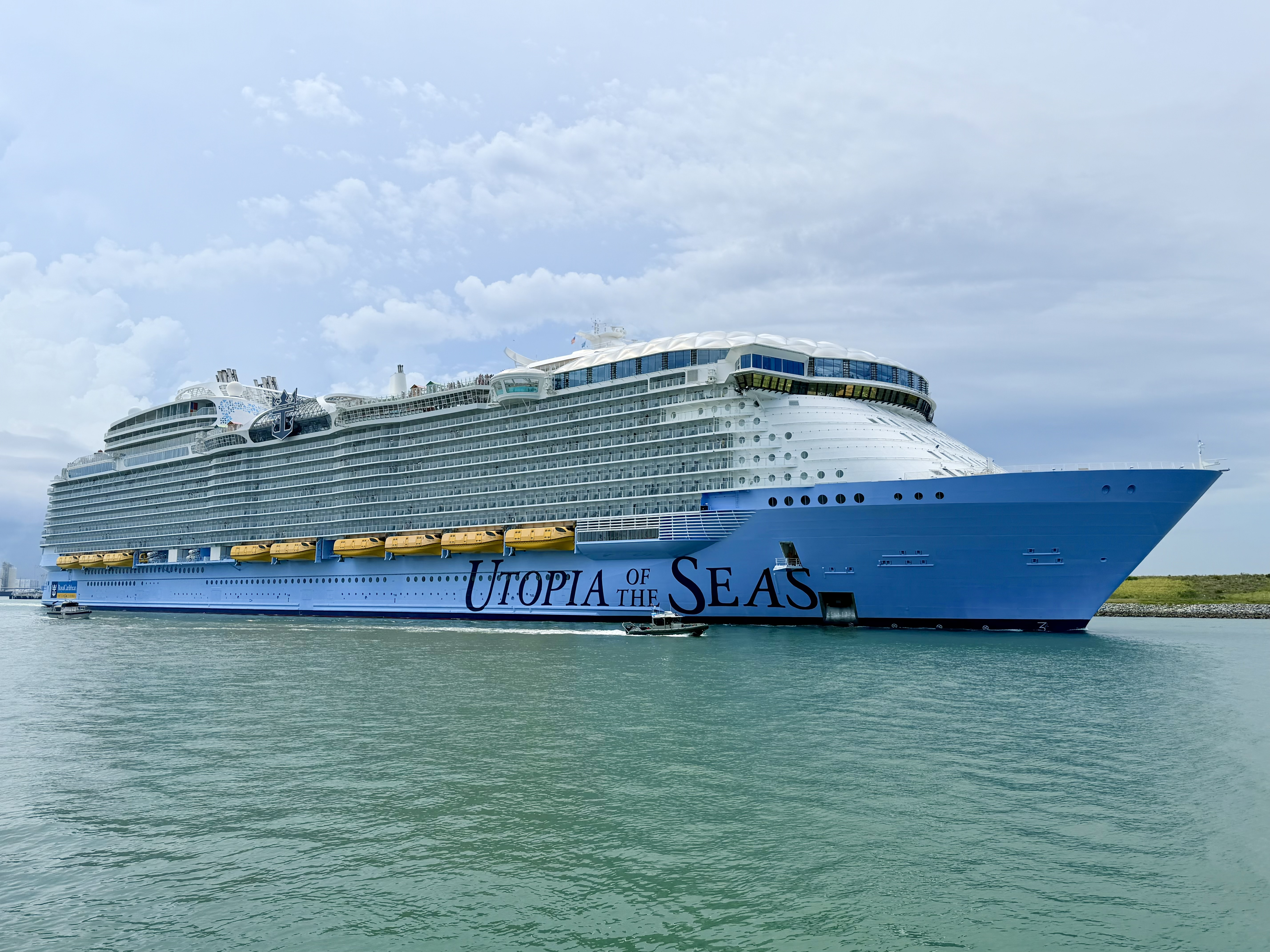
- Utopia of the Seas departing Port Canaveral on July 17, 2026

History
- Name: Utopia of the Seas
- Owner: Royal Caribbean Group
- Operator: Royal Caribbean International
- Port of registry: Nassau, Bahamas
- Route: The Bahamas
- Ordered: 2019
- Builder: Chantiers de l'Atlantique, Saint-Nazaire, France
- Laid down: 15 September 2020
- Launched: 16 September 2023
- Christened: 17 July 2024
- Completed: 14 June 2024
- Maiden voyage: 19 July 2024
- In service: 19 July 2024
- Identification: Call sign: C6GI9; IMO number: 9880001; MMSI number: 311001259; DNV ID: 42320
- Status: In service

General characteristics
- Class & type: Oasis-class cruise ship
- Tonnage: 236,473 GT, 290,833 NT
- Length: 362.12 metres (1,188.1 ft)
- Beam: 47.46 metres (155.7 ft)
- Draught: 9.3 metres (31 ft)
- Decks: 18 decks
- Installed power: 6 × Wärtsilä W12V46TS-DF, 15,600 kW (21,200 hp) each
- Propulsion: Diesel-electric; 3 × 20 MW (27,000 hp) ABB Azipod, all azimuthing; 4 × 3.5 MW (4,700 hp) Wärtsilä CT-3500 bow thrusters
- Capacity: 5,668 passengers (double occupancy)
- Crew: 2,290

Utopia of the Seas is a cruise ship operated by Royal Caribbean International. She is the sixth ship in the Oasis class and entered service on 19 July 2024 out of Port Canaveral. By gross tonnage, she is the fourth largest cruise ship in the world, larger than sister ship Wonder of the Seas, but surpassed by the Icon-class cruise ships, starting with Icon of the Seas.

== History ==
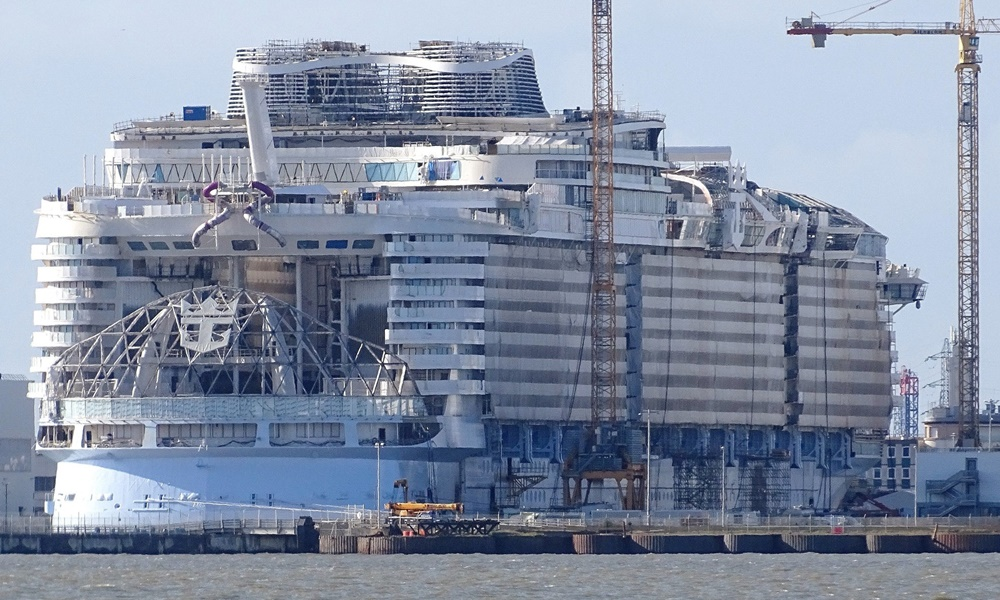
Utopia of the Seas under construction in April 2023

On 18 February 2019, Royal Caribbean and Chantiers de l'Atlantique announced an order of a sixth Oasis-class cruise ship for delivery in the fall of 2023. She is the first in the class to be powered by liquefied natural gas.

Royal Caribbean applied to register a trademark for Utopia of the Seas in 2021, along with 23 other ship names. The company announced the name Utopia of the Seas at the steel cutting ceremony on 5 April 2022, and the keel was laid on 1 July.

The LNG-tanks were built by Wärtsilä and delivered in November 2022. Utopia of the Seas was floated out of the building dock in September 2023, and started her sea trials on 7 May 2024.

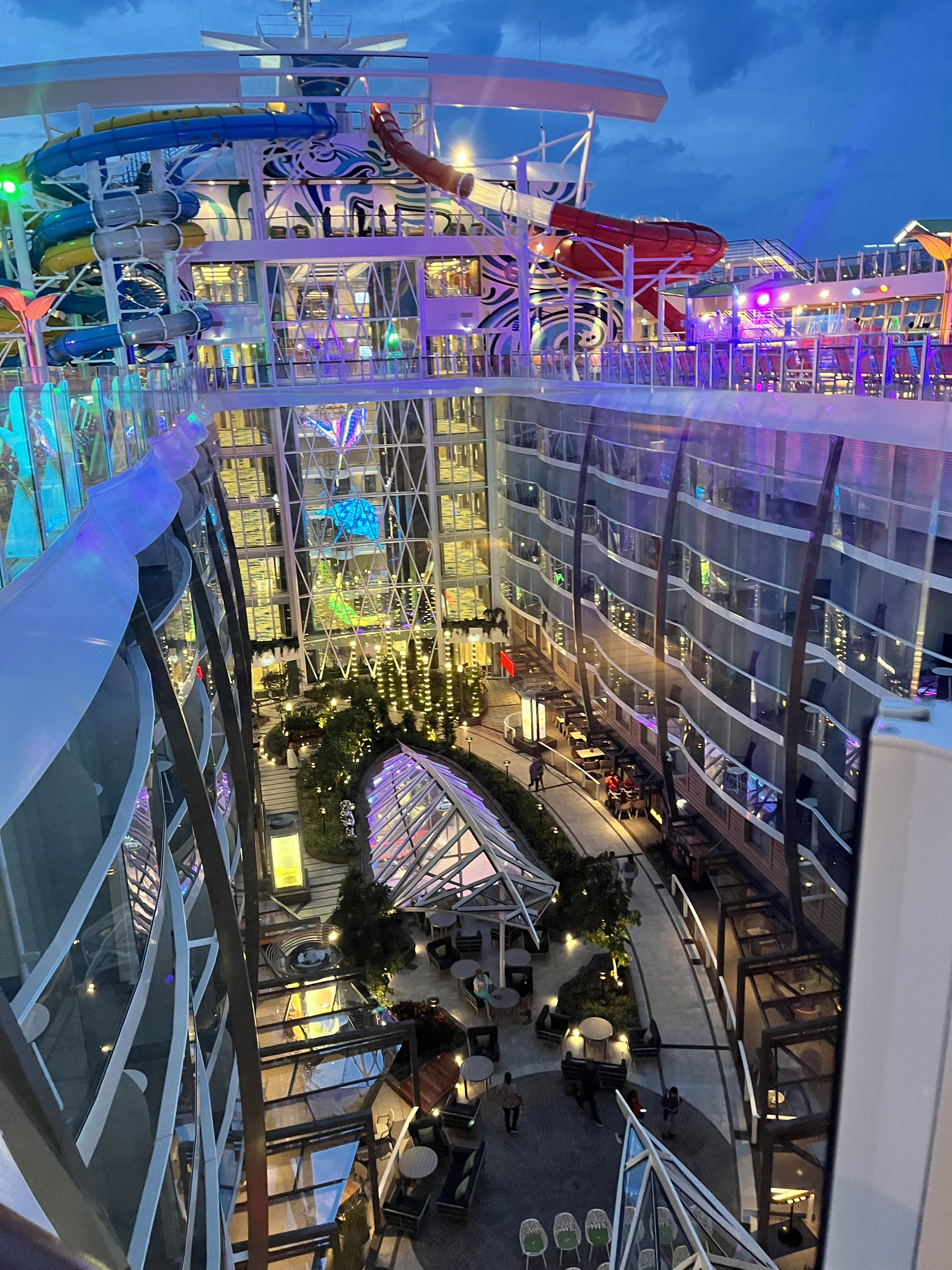
Central Park on Utopia of the Seas

Utopia of the Seas was delivered to Royal Caribbean on 13 June 2024, leaving the shipyard ten days later, and arrived at Port Canaveral on 11 July. She started her maiden voyage on 19 July from Port Canaveral.

On February 26, 2025, Utopia of the Seas diverged from her routine sailing route to the Bahamas to pass the historic ocean liner SS United States as it was being towed to Mobile, Alabama to be prepared for conversion into an artificial reef.
