= Oasis-class cruise ship =

Class of Royal Caribbean International cruise ships

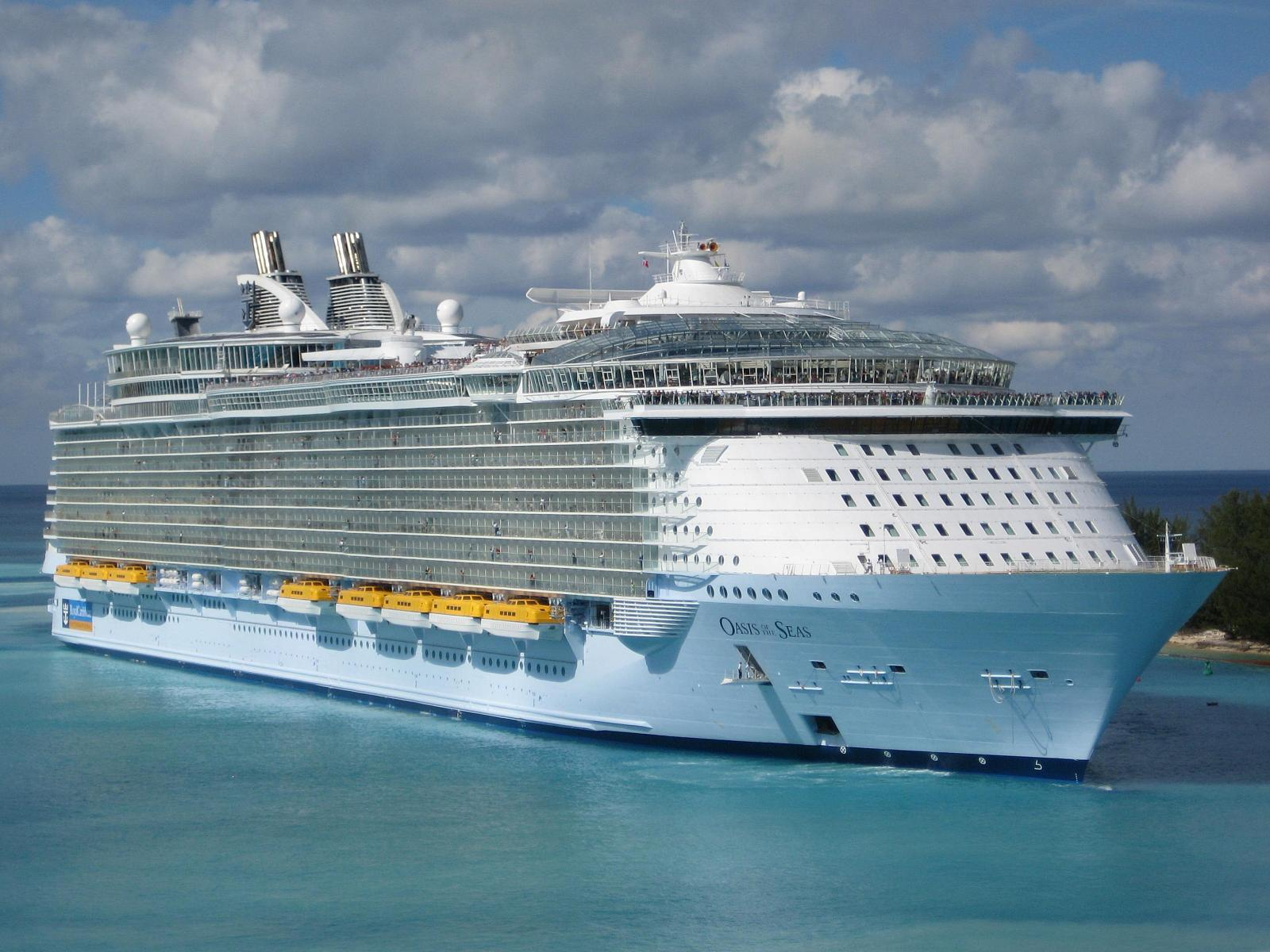
- Oasis of the Seas at Nassau, Bahamas, in January 2010

Class overview
- Builders: STX Finland Turku Shipyard (Now Meyer Turku), Finland & Chantiers de l'Atlantique, Saint-Nazaire, France
- Operators: Royal Caribbean International
- Preceded by: Freedom class
- Succeeded by: Icon class; Quantum class
- Built: 2007–2010; 2013–2028 (planned)
- In service: 2009–present
- Planned: 7
- Building: 1
- Completed: 6
- Active: 6

General characteristics
- Type: Cruise ship
- Tonnage: 225,282 GT–236,857 GT
- Length: 361.8 m (1,187 ft 0 in) overall
- Beam: 47 m (154 ft 2 in) waterline; 64.9 m (213 ft) extreme
- Height: 72 m (236 ft 3 in) above water line
- Draught: 9.3 m (30 ft 6 in)
- Depth: 22.55 m (74 ft 0 in)
- Decks: Oasis and Oasis Plus: 16 passenger decks, 18 decks total, Oasis Oasis Ultra - 17 passenger decks 19 decks total
- Installed power: 3 × Wärtsilä 12V46D, 13,860 kW (18,590 hp) each; 3 × Wärtsilä 16V46D, 18,480 kW (24,780 hp) each
- Propulsion: 3 × 20,000 kW (27,000 hp) ABB Azipod (all azimuthing); 4 × 5,500 kW (7,400 hp) Wärtsilä CT3500 bow thrusters
- Speed: 22.6 knots (41.9 km/h; 26.0 mph)
- Capacity: 5,400 passengers double occupancy; 6,296 total

The Oasis class is a class of six Royal Caribbean International cruise ships. The first two ships in the class, Oasis of the Seas and Allure of the Seas, were delivered respectively in 2009 and 2010 by STX Europe Turku Shipyard, Finland. A third Oasis-class vessel, Harmony of the Seas, was delivered in 2016 built by STX France. A fourth vessel, Symphony of the Seas, was completed in March 2018. As of March 2022, the fifth Oasis-class ship, Wonder of the Seas, was the largest cruise ship in the world. A sixth ship, Utopia of the Seas, slightly larger than the previous one, followed in July 2024, with a seventh to follow in 2028.

The first two ships in the class, Oasis of the Seas and Allure of the Seas, are slightly exceeded in size by the third ship, Harmony of the Seas. As of 2022, all ships of the Oasis class rank amongst the world's largest passenger ships although the title of overall largest is now held by the Icon-class cruise ships, beginning with lead ship Icon of the Seas. This means that Utopia of the Seas is the first in its class to not be the world's largest cruise ship.

== Ship features ==
The Oasis-class ships surpassed the earlier Freedom-class ships as the world's largest and longest passenger ships. Oasis of the Seas is also 8.5 metres (28 ft) wider, and with a gross tonnage of 225,282, is around 70,000 tones larger. Oasis-class vessels can carry over 5,400 passengers.

Oasis-class ships are split into a number of different themed neighborhoods. Common to all ships are Entertainment Place, Central Park, Boardwalk and Royal Promenade.

Oasis-class ships feature a split structure, with the 5-deck high "Central Park" and "Boardwalk" outdoor areas running down the middle of the ship. These areas feature tropical gardens, restaurants, shops, and a working carousel.

=== Differences in design ===
Each successive ship has variations in the design and layout.

Harmony of the Seas introduced new bars and restaurants from the first-generation Quantum class, the Ultimate Abyss dry slide, a new waterpark and an escape room The H_{2}O Zone kids pool was replaced with an upgraded kids facility called Splashaway Bay.

Wonder of the Seas carries around 200 additional guests at double occupancy and 100 additional crew, and includes a refurbished pool deck with a large movie screen and an additional pool on board, though far fewer hot tubs. The adults-only pool area is now enclosed and climate-controlled. It also has a new neighborhood: the Suite Neighborhood. Other additions include a new playground and new food and drink venues.

== Technical details ==
The displacement—the actual mass—is estimated at 100,000 tonnes, equivalent to the displacement of a Nimitz-class aircraft carrier.

To keep the ship stable without increasing the draft excessively, the designers created a wide hull. The cruise ship's officers were pleased with the ship class's stability and performance during the transatlantic crossing, when the vessel slowed and changed course in the face of winds "almost up to hurricane force" and seas in excess of 12 metres (40 ft).

The ship's power comes from six medium-speed, marine-diesel generating sets: three 16-cylinder Wärtsilä 16V46D common rail engines producing 18,480 kW (24,780 hp) each and three similar 12-cylinder Wärtsilä 12V46D engines producing 13,860 kW (18,590 hp) each. The fuel consumption of the main engines at full power is 5,213 litres (1,377 US gal) of fuel oil per engine per hour for the 16-cylinder engines, and 3,910 litres (1,033 US gal) per engine per hour for the 12-cylinder engines.

The total output of these prime movers, some 97,020 kW (130,110 hp), is converted to electricity, used in hotel power for operation of the lights, elevators, electronics, galleys, water treatment plant, and all of the other systems used on the operation of the vessel, as well as propulsion. Propulsion is provided by three 20,000 kW (26,800 hp) Azipods, ABB's brand of electric azimuth thrusters. These pods, suspended under the stern, contain electric motors driving 6-metre (20 ft) propellers. Because they are rotatable, no rudders are needed to steer the ship. Docking is assisted by four 5,500 kW (7,380 hp) transverse bow thrusters.

The ship carries 18 lifeboats that hold 370 people each, for a total of 6,660 people. Inflatable life rafts provide for additional passengers and crew.

The sixth ship needs 25 percent less energy than the first.

== Ships ==
There are 6 vessels in the class, the most recent being Utopia of the Seas. A further seventh ship has been ordered and will join the fleet in 2028.

Ship	Status	Maiden voyage	Gross tonnage	Length	Notes	Image
Oasis of the Seas	In service	5 December 2009	226,838 (previously 225,282)	360 m (1,180 ft)	First in class. Underwent refitting in 2019.	
Allure of the Seas	In service	1 December 2010	226,637 (previously 225,282)	360 m (1,180 ft)	Underwent refitting in April 2025.	
Harmony of the Seas	In service	29 May 2016	226,963	362.12 m (1,188.1 ft)	Underwent refitting in April 2026.	
Symphony of the Seas	In service	7 April 2018	228,081	361.011 m (1,184.42 ft)		
Wonder of the Seas	In service	4 March 2022	235,600	362.1 m (1,188 ft)		
Utopia of the Seas	In service	19 July 2024	236,473	362,12	The first in the class to be powered by liquified natural gas.	
TBA	Under construction	2028 (planned)	TBA	TBA	Keel laid on June 12, 2026.	

== Ship construction ==
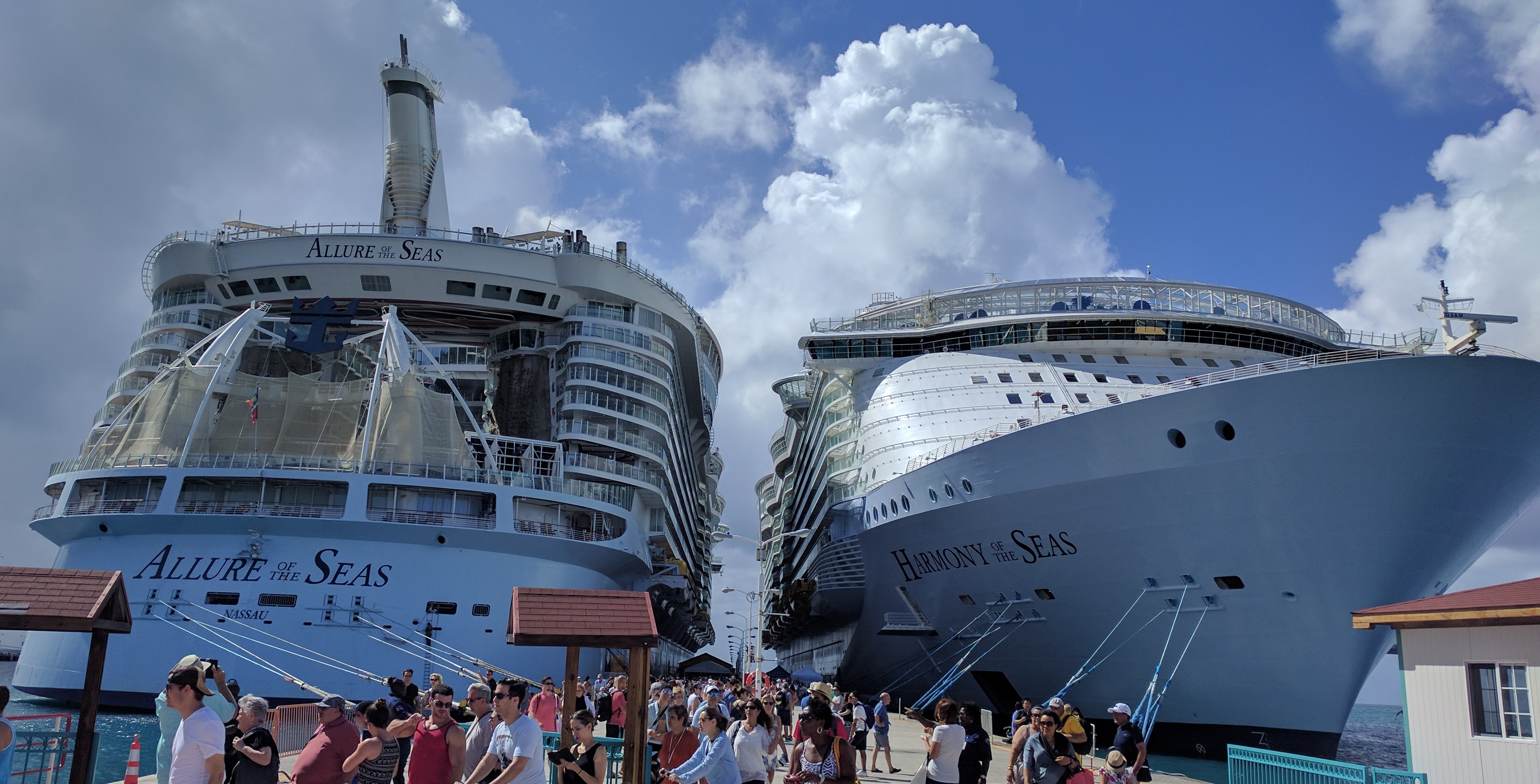
Allure of the Seas (left) and Harmony of the Seas (right) docked next to each other in Philipsburg, Sint Maarten

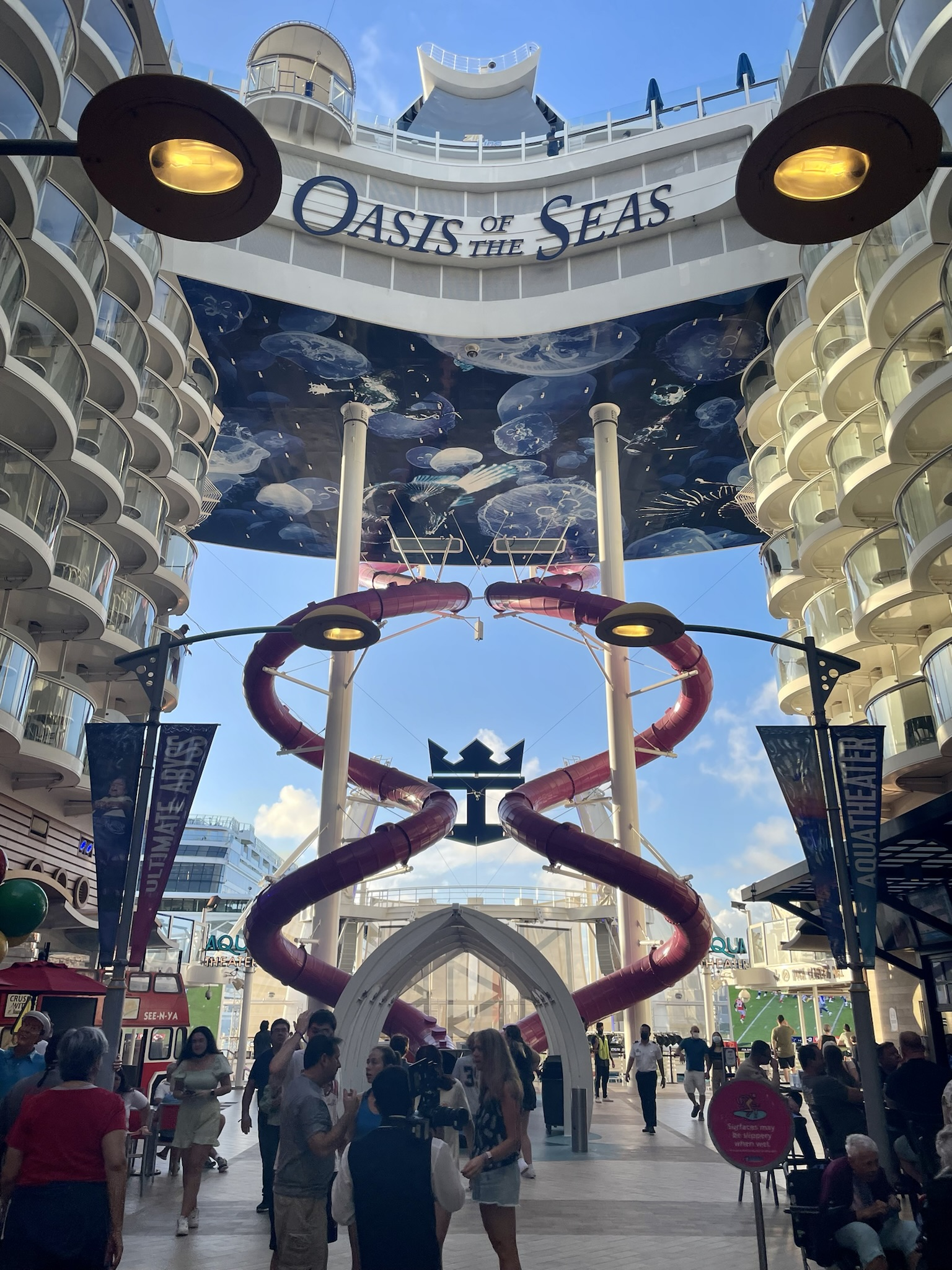
The Oasis of the Seas Boardwalk

Oasis of the Seas, the first vessel of the class, was ordered in February 2006 and designed under the name "Project Genesis". Her keel was laid down in December 2007 by STX Europe Turku Shipyard, Finland. The name Oasis of the Seas resulted from a competition held in May 2008. and full financing for Oasis of the Seas was secured in April 2009. The ship was completed and turned over to Royal Caribbean on 28 October 2009. Two days later, she departed Finland for the United States.

While exiting the Baltic Sea, the vessel passed underneath the Great Belt Fixed Link in Denmark in October 2009. The bridge has a clearance of 65 m (213 ft) above the water. Oasis of the Seas normally has an air draft of 72 m (236 ft). The passage under the bridge was possible due to retraction of the telescoping funnels, and an additional 30 cm (12 in) was gained by the squat effect where vessels traveling at speed in a shallow channel are drawn deeper into the water. Approaching the bridge at 23 knots (43 km/h; 26 mph), the ship passed under it with less than 60 centimetres (2 ft) of clearance.

Proceeding through the English Channel, Oasis of the Seas stopped briefly in the Solent so that 300 shipyard workers who were on board doing finishing work could disembark. She then left for her intended home port of Port Everglades in Fort Lauderdale, Florida. The ship arrived there on 13 November 2009, where tropical plants were installed prior to some introductory trips and her maiden voyage on 5 December 2009.

The keel of the second ship, Allure of the Seas, was laid on 2 December 2008 at the STX Europe Turku shipyard, Finland, during a ceremony involving Royal Caribbean and STX representatives. She was launched on 20 November 2009, with further outfitting taking place while afloat in the shipyard. Allure of the Seas was delivered to Royal Caribbean on 28 October 2010. She left the Turku shipyard on 29 October 2010, heading directly to her home port of Port Everglades. The ship is equipped with telescoping funnels to pass under bridges such as the Storebælt Bridge, which she passed on 30 October 2010. While media has reported that there was only 30 centimetres (12 in) of clearance, the mean water level was closer to 2–3 metres (6.6–9.8 ft). The squat effect, where vessels traveling at speed in a shallow channel will be drawn deeper into the water, did not have significant effect on the draft of the vessel.

Royal Caribbean confirmed in October 2012 that they were engaged in negotiations to build the third Oasis-class ship, which became Harmony of the Seas. The ship was ordered from STX France in December 2012, after failing to come to an agreement with the Government of Finland for additional financial support to build the ship at the STX Finland shipyard that built the first two ships. Steel cutting began in September 2013, and the ship was delivered in May 2016. The ship is larger than the earlier Oasis-class ships at an estimated 227,700 GT, 362.15 metres (1,188 ft 2 in) in length, and 66 metres (216 ft 6 in) in maximum width, representing an increase of 2,418 GT and 2.15 metres (7 ft 1 in) length.

The ship has 2,744 passenger staterooms with a capacity of 6,360 passengers (5,488 double occupancy), an increase of 64 passengers over the previous ships in the class, as well as 1,197 crew cabins capable of berthing 2,100 crew. The ship features an expanded adults-only solarium area and three water slides, a first for Royal Caribbean. It cost about €1 billion (US$1.35 billion) and entered service in May 2016.

In May 2014, Royal Caribbean exercised their option for a fourth Oasis-class ship, which became Symphony of the Seas. Steel cutting began in February 2015, and the name of the ship was announced in March 2017. The ship was delivered in April 2018.

In May 2016, Royal Caribbean signed an agreement for a fifth Oasis-class ship, later named Wonder of the Seas. Steel cutting began in April 2019, and the keel was laid in October 2019. The ship name was announced in October 2019. A hull section was built at Crist at Gdansk and delivered to the yard in November 2019. She was launched in September 2020. Wonder of the Seas entered service in March 2022 as the largest ship in the world. She initially offering Caribbean sailings from Ft. Lauderdale, FL before repositioning to Europe to offer Western Mediterranean sailings from Barcelona, Spain and Rome, Italy.

In February 2019, Royal Caribbean Cruises Ltd. ordered a sixth Oasis-class ship, named Utopia of the Seas. Steel cutting began in Chantiers de l'Atlantique shipyard in April 2022. Keel laying was held in July 2022.

Negotiations about a seventh vessel, to be built as B35 and to be delivered in 2026, were stopped in 2020 because of the coronavirus pandemic. In February 2024, Royal Caribbean and Chantiers de l'Atlantique announced that they signed an agreement for a seventh Oasis Class ship to be delivered in 2028. The construction of the ship started on 23 October 2025.
