= Wonder of the Seas =

Oasis-class cruise ship

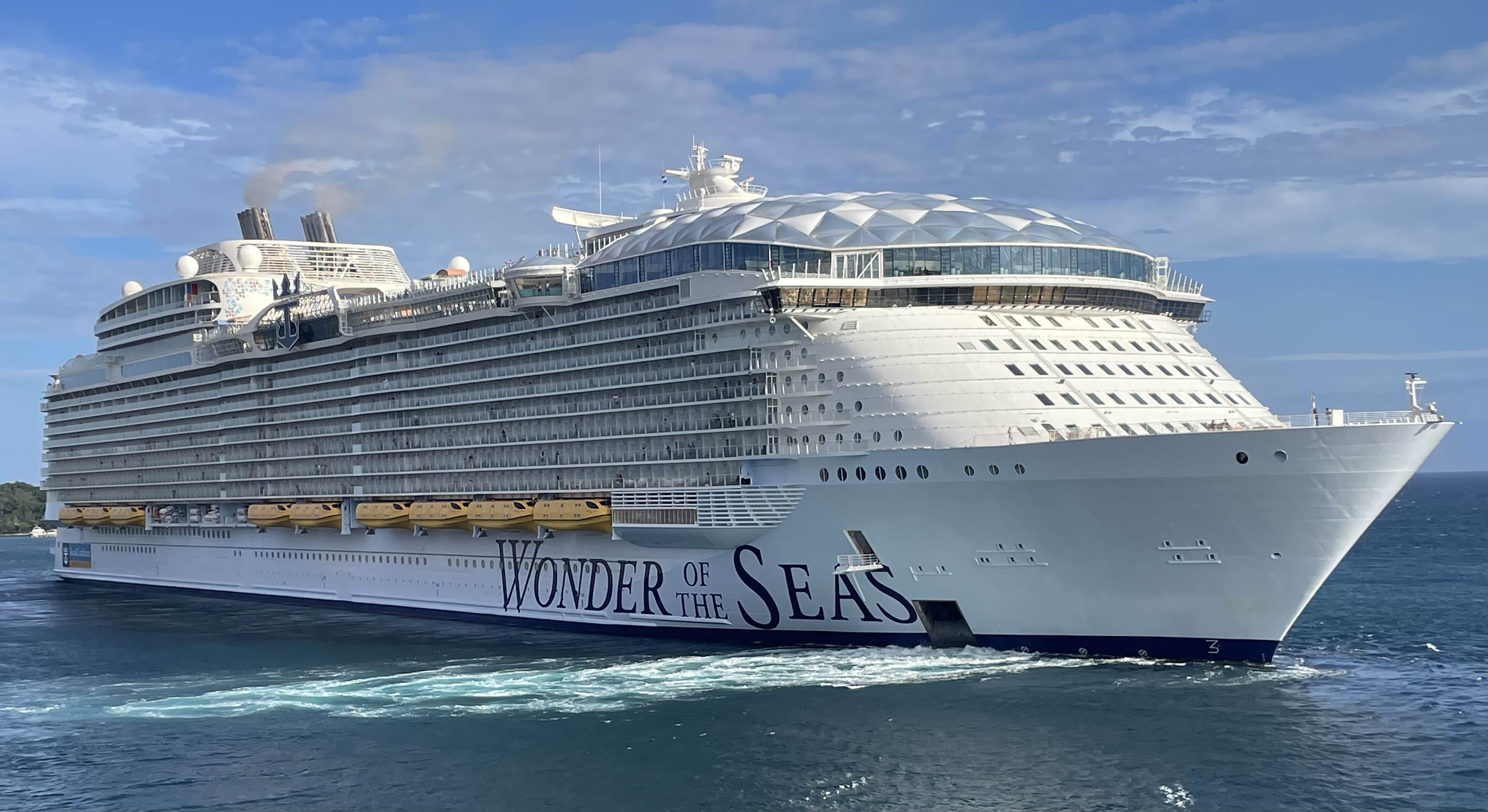
- Wonder of the Seas departing Coxen Hole, Roatan

History

Bahamas
- Name: Wonder of the Seas
- Owner: Royal Caribbean Group
- Operator: Royal Caribbean International
- Port of registry: Nassau, Bahamas
- Route: Caribbean; Mediterranean
- Ordered: 25 May 2016 (MoU); 27 September 2016 (contract date)
- Builder: Chantiers de l'Atlantique, Saint-Nazaire France
- Yard number: C34
- Laid down: 9 May 2019
- Launched: 4 September 2020
- Sponsored by: Marie McCrea
- Christened: 9 December 2022
- Completed: 27 January 2022
- Acquired: 27 January 2022
- Maiden voyage: 4 March 2022
- In service: 2022–present
- Identification: Call sign: C6EY2; IMO number: 9838345; MMSI number: 311001033; DNV ID: 38209
- Status: In service

General characteristics
- Class & type: Oasis-class cruise ship
- Tonnage: 235,600 GT; 274,598 NT; 17,100 DWT
- Length: 362.04 m (1,187 ft 10 in)
- Beam: 47.4 m (155 ft 6 in) waterline; 64 m (210 ft) max beam
- Height: 73.2 m (240 ft)
- Draught: 9.3 m (30 ft 6 in)
- Decks: 19
- Installed power: 4 × 14,400 kW (19,300 hp) Wärtsilä 12V46F; 2 × 19,200 kW (25,700 hp) Wärtsilä 16V46F; 2 × 2,070 kW (2,780 hp) MTU 16V4000; Total: 100,140 kW (134,290 hp)
- Propulsion: Diesel-electric; 3 × 20 MW (27,000 hp) ABB Azipod, all azimuthing; 4 × 5.5 MW (7,400 hp) Wärtsilä CT3500; bow thrusters; Total: 82 MW (110,000 hp)
- Speed: 22.0 knots (40.7 km/h; 25.3 mph) cruising
- Capacity: 5,734 passengers at double occupancy; 7,084 passengers maximum
- Crew: 2,369

Wonder of the Seas is a cruise ship operated by Royal Caribbean International. She was completed in 2022 in the Chantiers de l'Atlantique shipyard in Saint-Nazaire France, the fifth in Royal Caribbean's Oasis class of cruise ships. At 235,600 GT, she was the largest cruise ship by gross tonnage, until she was surpassed in 2024 by the Icon-class cruise ship, Icon of the Seas, also owned by Royal Caribbean International.

== Description and design ==
Wonder of the Seas measures 1,188 feet (362 m) in length and has a gross tonnage of 236,857 across 18 decks. This ship accommodates 5,734 passengers at double occupancy or up to a maximum of 6,988 passengers, as well as a 2,300 crew. There are 16 decks for guest use, 20 restaurants, four pools and 2,867 cabins.

Facilities include a children's water park, a children's playground, a full-size basketball court, an ice-skating rink, a surf simulator, a zip line that is 10 decks high, a 1,400-seat theater, an outdoor aquatic theater with 30-foot (9.1 m) high platforms, and two 43-foot (13 m) rock-climbing walls.

As with all Oasis-class ships, one of the special features on board is the Central Park, with more than 10,000 plants and flowers.

Wonder of the Seas is powered by six marine-diesel sets: two 16-cylinder Wärtsilä 16V46D common rail engines and four 12-cylinder Wärtsilä 12V46D engines.

For propulsion, Wonder of the Seas uses three 20,000 kilowatt azipod main engines, which are electric thrusters. These engines are mounted under the stern of the ship and they each drive 20 foot wide rotatable propellers. In addition to the three electric thrusters, there are four bow thrusters used for docking, each with 5,500 kilowatts of power or 7,380 horsepower.

== Construction and career ==
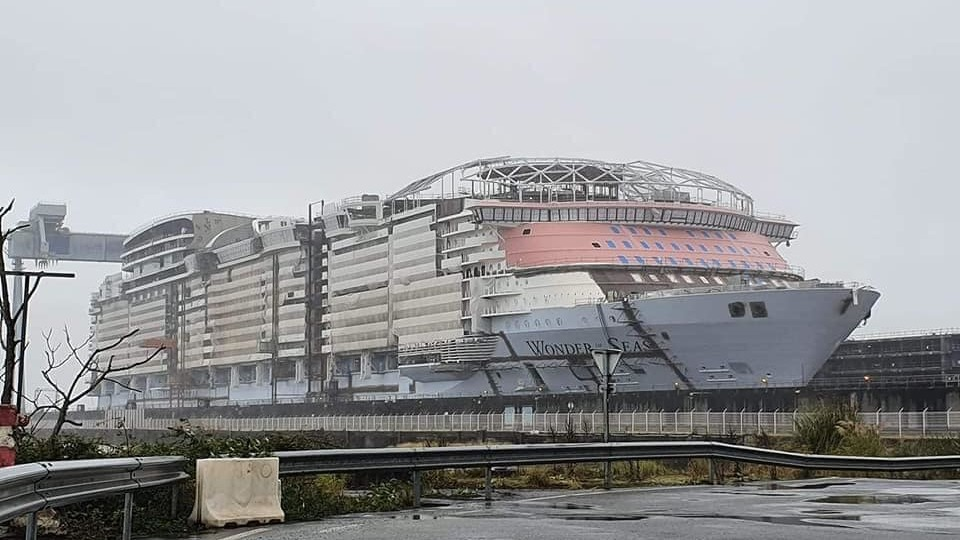
Wonder of the Seas under construction in Saint-Nazaire France in 2020

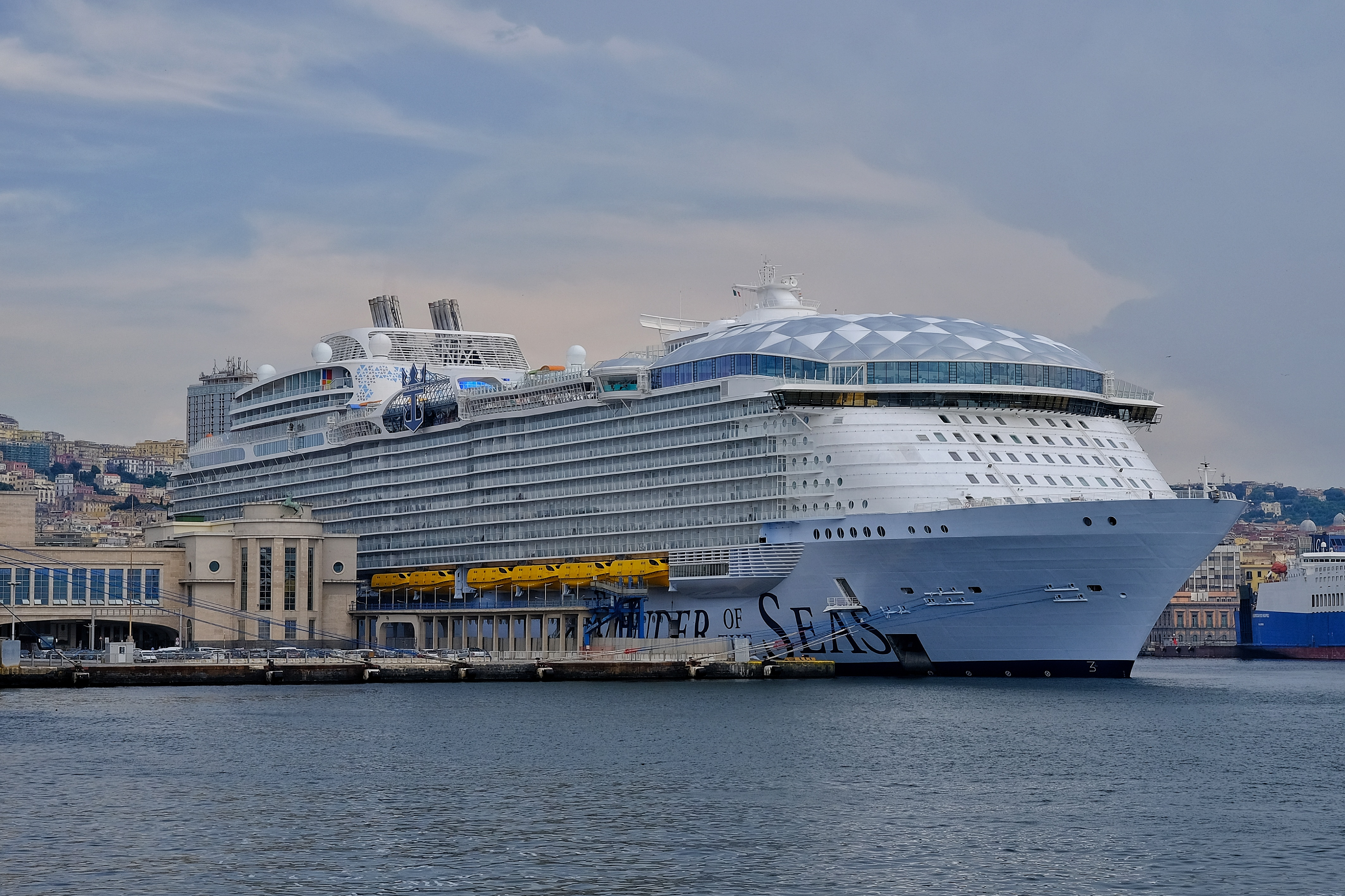
Wonder of the Seas in Port of Naples

On 25 May 2016, the Royal Caribbean Group signed a memorandum of understanding with STX France (now Chantiers de l'Atlantique) for a fifth Oasis-class ship for delivery in the spring of 2021. and two more ships of the Edge class. The first steel for the new ship was cut at the Saint-Nazaire shipyard in April 2019, and the vessel's keel was laid on 9 May 2019. Construction cost £1 billion.

In August 2020, as a result of the COVID-19 pandemic, Royal Caribbean announced that delivery of the ship would be delayed until 2022.

In April 2021, Royal Caribbean opened bookings aboard Wonder of the Seas for an inaugural 2022 season sailing in Asia from ports in Shanghai and Hong Kong. However, in September of that year, Royal Caribbean announced that the ship would instead debut at Port Everglades, sailing Caribbean cruises, before moving to the Mediterranean in the summer, sailing out of Barcelona and Rome. In November 2021, the ship's livery was modified to resemble that of Odyssey of the Seas, with her name moved rearward and repainted in larger print. The following month, Royal Caribbean announced that the ship would homeport at Port Canaveral, Florida starting in November 2022.

On 29 October 2021, Royal Caribbean accepted the ship for "technical delivery", and the following week she sailed under her own power from Saint-Nazaire to a Chantier Naval de Marseille drydock in Marseille-Fos Port for finishing work. On 27 January 2022, the ship was handed over to Royal Caribbean. Wonder of the Seas commenced her maiden voyage on 4 March 2022 out of Port Everglades, Florida. On 9 December 2022, she was christened by Marie McCrea, the ship's godmother, who bestowed her blessing amongst the vessel.

After being home-ported in Port Canaveral since November 2022, Royal Caribbean announced that Wonder of the Seas would be repositioned to PortMiami starting 25 August 2025. The vessel would begin offering 3 and 4 night cruises to Nassau and CocoCay.

== Incidents ==
- In November 2022, a Wonder of the Seas crewmember died by suicide after going overboard the ship. The crew member reportedly had asked to leave and return home. However, his request had been denied prior to the crew member's death.
- In August 2023, 19-year-old college student Sigmund Ropich went overboard Wonder of the Seas while on a Caribbean cruise with his friend and their family. Despite a search by the ship and the Cuban Coast Guard, Ropich has never been found.
