= Harmony of the Seas =

Oasis-class Royal Caribbean International cruise ship

- Harmony of the Seas Departs Port Canaveral on 3 September 2026

History

Bahamas
- Name: Harmony of the Seas
- Owner: Royal Caribbean Group
- Operator: Royal Caribbean International
- Port of registry: Nassau, Bahamas
- Route: Caribbean
- Ordered: 27 December 2012
- Builder: Chantiers de l'Atlantique
- Cost: US$1.35 billion (2015)
- Yard number: A34
- Laid down: 9 May 2014
- Launched: 19 June 2015 (float-out)
- Completed: 13 May 2016
- Acquired: 12 May 2016
- Maiden voyage: 29 May 2016
- In service: 2016–present
- Refit: 3 April 2026
- Home port: Port Canaveral, Florida
- Identification: Call sign: C6BX8; IMO number: 9682875; MMSI number: 311000396; DNV ID: 33249
- Status: In service

General characteristics
- Class & type: Oasis-class cruise ship
- Tonnage: 226,963 GT; 257,566 NT; 20,236 DWT
- Displacement: Approximately 120,000 t (132,000 short tons)
- Length: 362.12 m (1,188.1 ft)
- Beam: 47.42 m (155.6 ft) waterline; 66 m (217 ft) max beam
- Draught: 9.322 m (30.6 ft)
- Depth: 22.6 m (74 ft)
- Decks: 18; 16 passenger decks
- Installed power: 4 × 14,400 kW (19,300 hp) Wärtsilä 12V46F; 2 × 19,200 kW (25,700 hp) Wärtsilä 16V46F
- Propulsion: 3 × 20 MW (27,000 hp) ABB Azipod, all azimuthing; 4 × 5.5 MW (7,400 hp) Wärtsilä CT3500; bow thrusters
- Speed: 25 knots (46 km/h; 29 mph) maximum; 22 knots (41 km/h; 25 mph) cruising
- Capacity: 5,479 passengers at double occupancy; 6,780 maximum
- Crew: 2,300

Harmony of the Seas is an Oasis-class cruise ship built by STX France at the Chantiers de l'Atlantique shipyard in Saint-Nazaire, France, for Royal Caribbean International. With a gross tonnage of 226,963 GT, she is the seventh largest passenger ship in the world.

== History ==
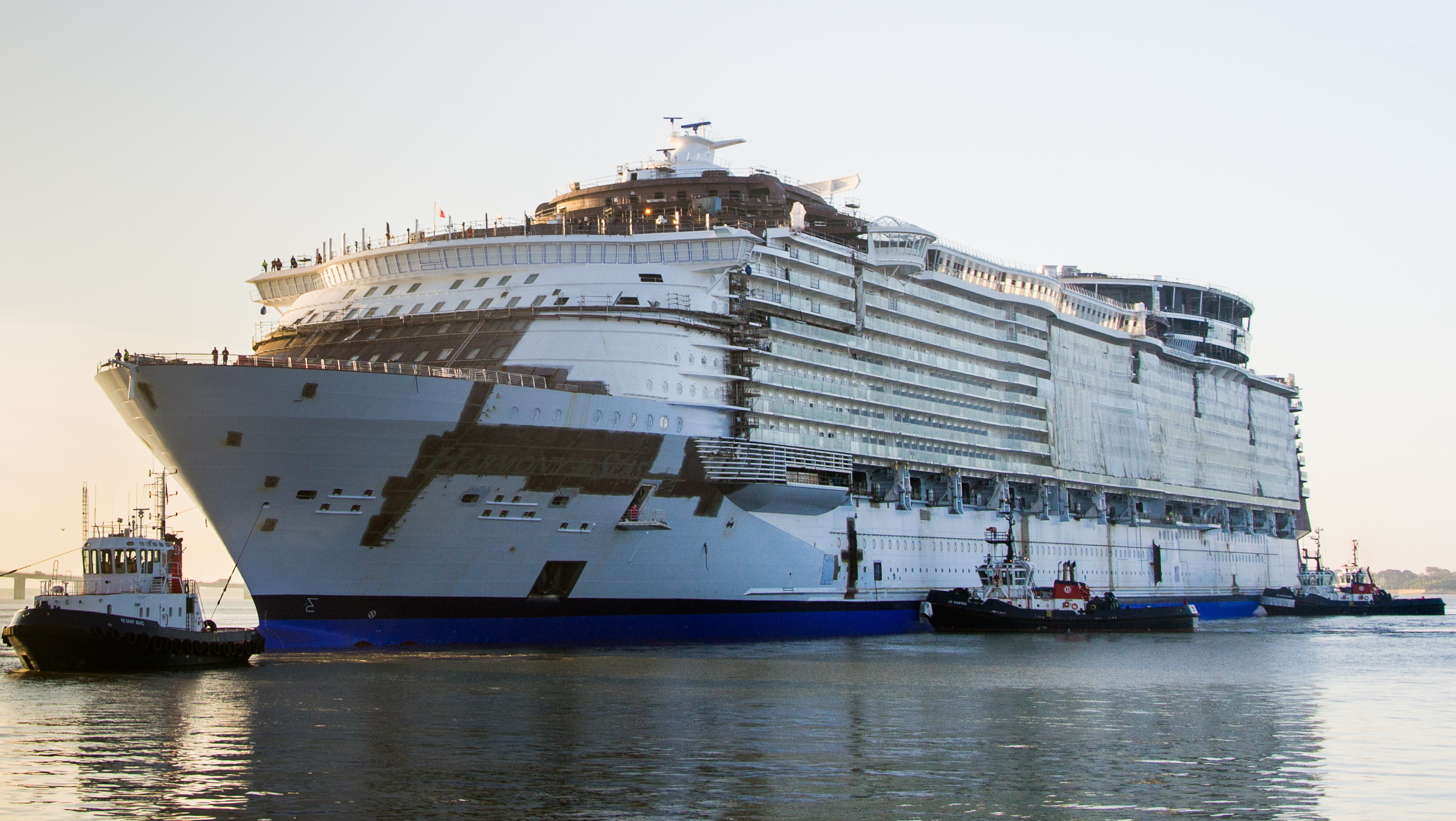
Harmony of the Seas under construction at STX yards in France

The success of the first two Oasis-class ships led Royal Caribbean Cruises to order a third ship of the type in December 2012. The contract with STX France includes an option to build a second vessel. Harmony of the Seas is named after the Harmony module on the International Space Station.

=== Launch ===
The vessel was floated out on 19 June 2015, began her first sea trials on 10 March 2016, and was delivered to Royal Caribbean on 12 May 2016.

After a construction time of 32 months, the ship first set sail on 15 May 2016 from the STX France docks in Saint-Nazaire, viewed by some 70,000 people. Her first destination was Southampton, England, although her home port was Barcelona until 23 October 2016 when she crossed the Atlantic.

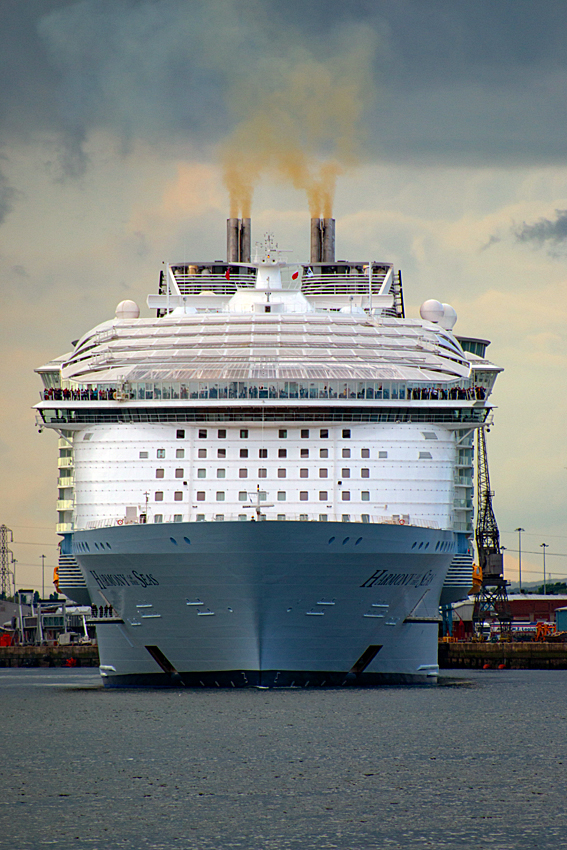
Harmony of the Seas departing Southampton on a preview cruise

Harmony of the Seas took two short "preview cruises", three nights to Cherbourg and four nights to Rotterdam, after reaching port in Southampton on 17 May. During these voyages, passengers complained of ongoing construction, a lack of hot water, unopened attractions, excessive waits at restaurants, and other issues.

=== Maiden voyage ===
The ship's maiden voyage departed from Southampton on 29 May and arrived at its summer home port of Barcelona on 5 June. According to passengers on this cruise, construction had finished and the ship was ready to sail. For the inaugural season, Harmony of the Seas offered seven-night western Mediterranean cruises originating from Barcelona and Civitavecchia.

On 10 November 2016, the vessel was officially christened by her godmother, Miami-Dade County teacher Brittany Affolter.

=== Refurbishment ===
In April 2026, Harmony of the Seas underwent a six-week refurbishment in Navantia shipyard in Cádiz, Spain, which added The Lime & Coconut bar, El Loco Fresh, Samba Grill Brazilian Steakhouse (located in the Solarium Bistro during the evening), Panoramic & Ultimate Family Suites, and an expanded casino to the ship.

== Design ==
=== Facilities ===
Harmony of the Seas has 2,747 staterooms, of various sizes, to accommodate (at double occupancy) 5,479 guests. The ship is divided into seven neighborhoods, including Central Park and Boardwalk, like her Oasis-class sisters. Harmony of the Seas has a number of water-based attractions including two surf simulators, three water slides, and 3 swimming pools. These include the first water slides on a Royal Caribbean ship. It also includes a large dry slide complex, known as The Ultimate Abyss. She also has 20 dining venues, a 1,400-seat theatre and 11,252 works of art.

=== Technology ===
Harmony of the Seas is 20 percent more energy efficient than her sister ships Oasis of the Seas and Allure of the Seas. Small air bubbles from the keel reduce drag and thus fuel consumption by 7 to 8 percent, and a smooth hull surface further reduces resistance. The bubble system also reduces propeller noise, and is used on Celebrity Reflection and Quantum of the Seas. LED and fluorescent lamps replace incandescent light bulbs, reducing power consumption and the need for air conditioning. The engine system uses a waste heat recovery system, and drives three Azipod propellers.

Harmony of the Seas docked in Fort Lauderdale on 24 March 2018

== Incidents ==
- On 13 September 2016, one employee was killed and four were injured when a lifeboat broke loose and dropped from the fifth deck during a security drill.
- On 25 December 2018, British crew member Arron Hough was reported missing by other crew members after failing to report to work. The United States Coast Guard suspended the search for the on-board entertainer on 27 December 2018, after stating that the ship had reported that a crew member had gone overboard.
- On 11 January 2019, 16-year-old Laurent Mercer was trying to enter his eighth-deck cabin through a nearby balcony when he slipped and fell to his death. The accident happened while the ship was docked in Labadee, a leased peninsula in Haiti. The ship's medical team performed cardiopulmonary resuscitation, but he had sustained major head trauma and died of his injuries.
- On 30 January 2022, Harmony of the Seas entered a temporary exclusion zone around Cape Canaveral, which caused the postponement of a planned launch of a SpaceX Falcon 9 rocket. The rocket was able to successfully launch the following evening. A Coast Guard investigation found Royal Caribbean responsible for the incident, but also led to reforms in how the Coast Guard determines exclusion zones and disseminates that information to ships.
- On 26 May 2022, the vessel collided with a jetty in Falmouth, Jamaica. The vessel suffered minimal damage, and was safely docked shortly afterwards. No injuries were reported.
- On 7 September 2024, a guest died on board the ship while out at sea. The 12-year-old child died when falling from a balcony, in an incident reminiscent of the 2019 incident where Laurent Mercer was fatally injured when falling from a balcony.
- In October 2024, the ship sailed dangerously close to Hurricane Milton which resulted in the ship encountering large waves and extreme rocking aboard the ship.

== Gallery ==
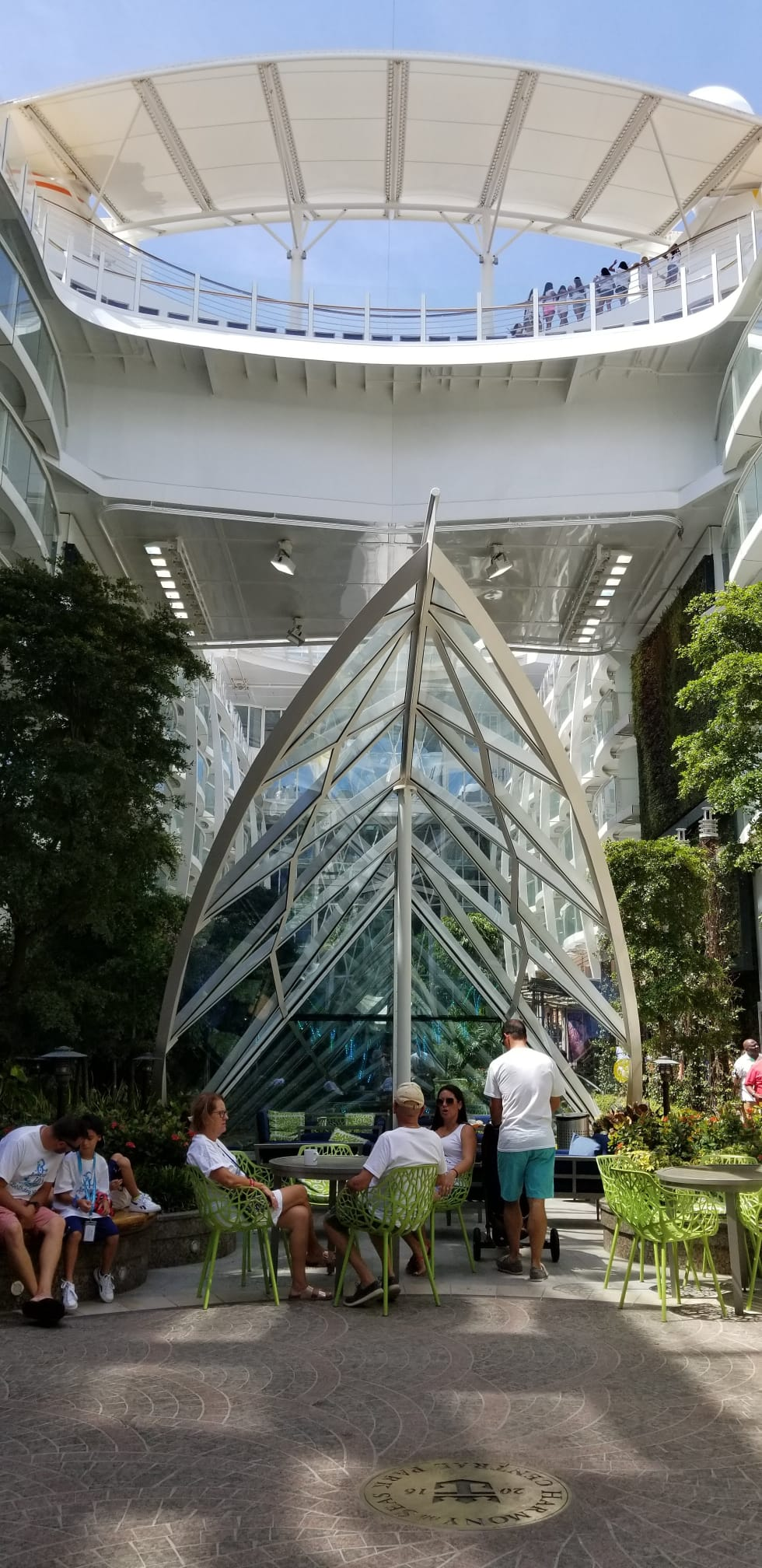
Central Park

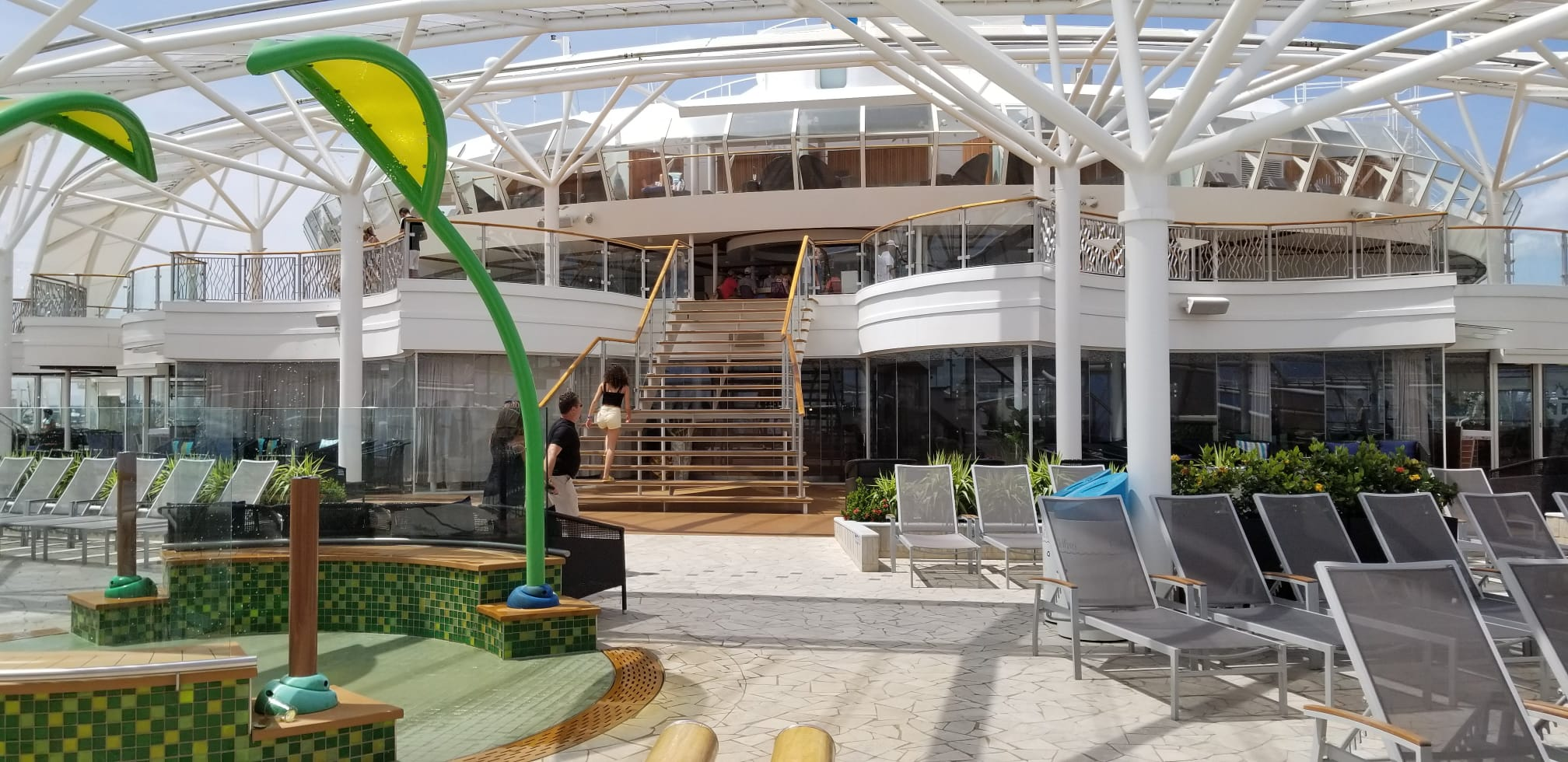
The Solarium

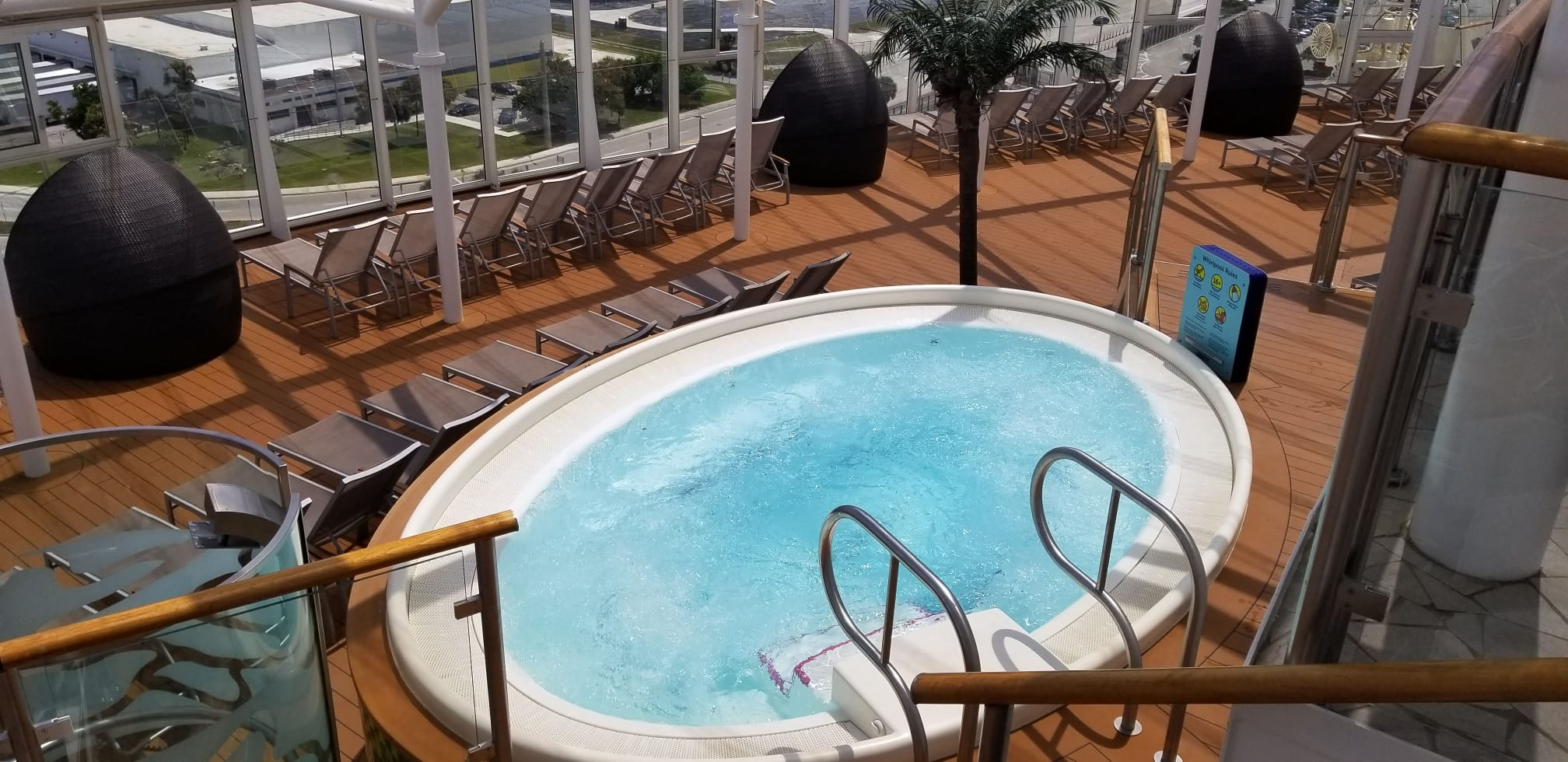
Hot tub

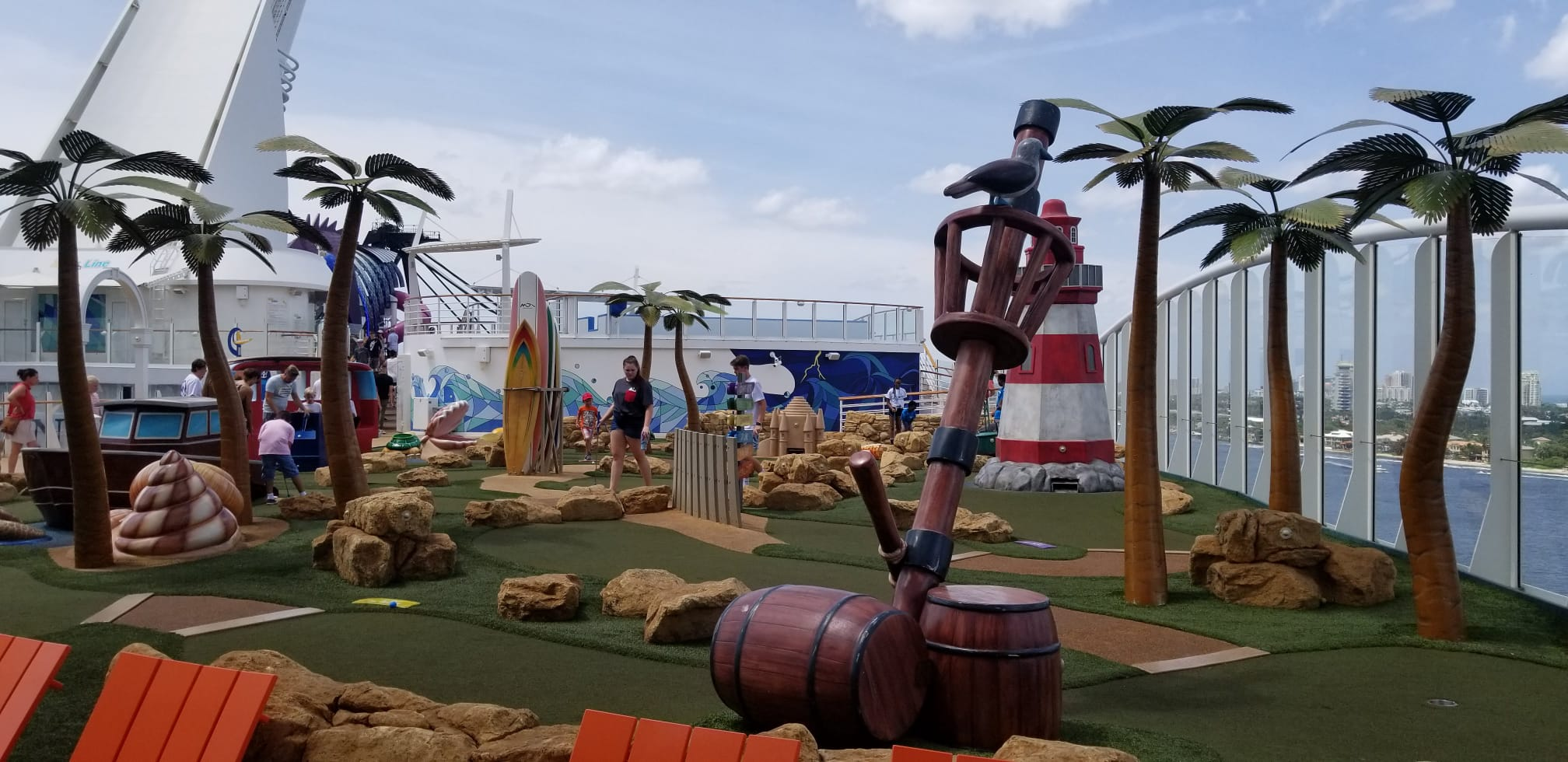
Mini golf

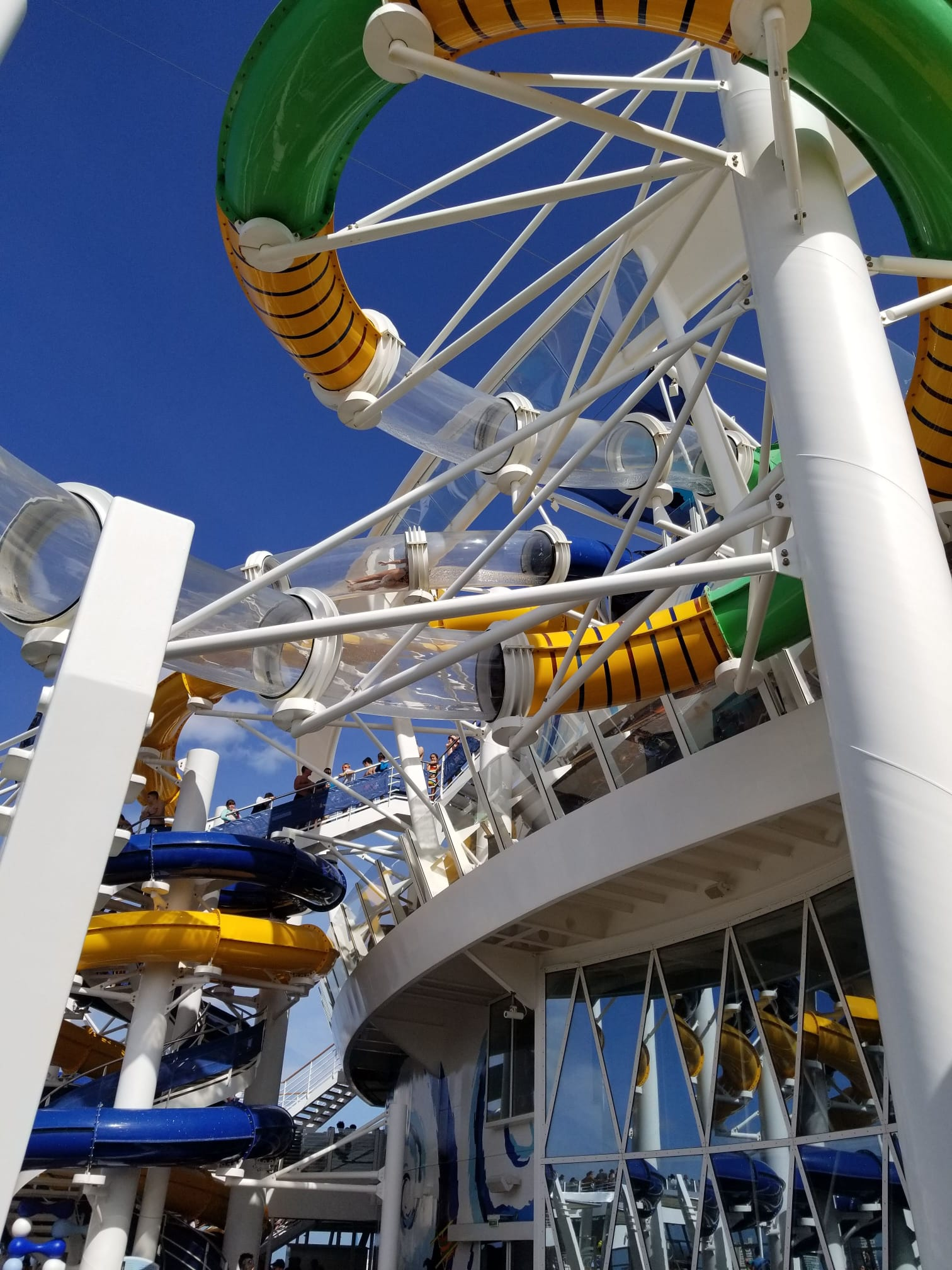
Waterslides

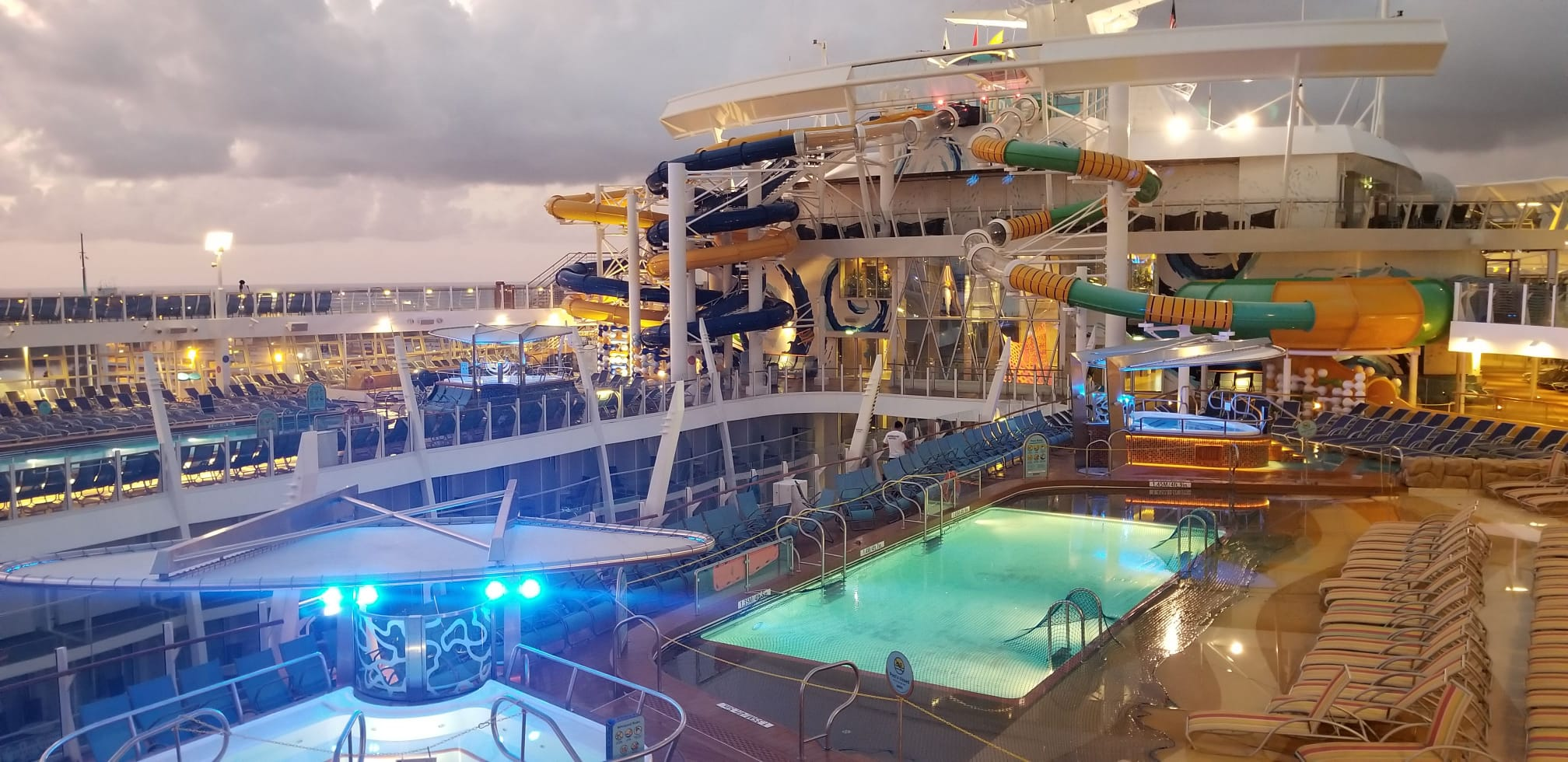
Pool zone

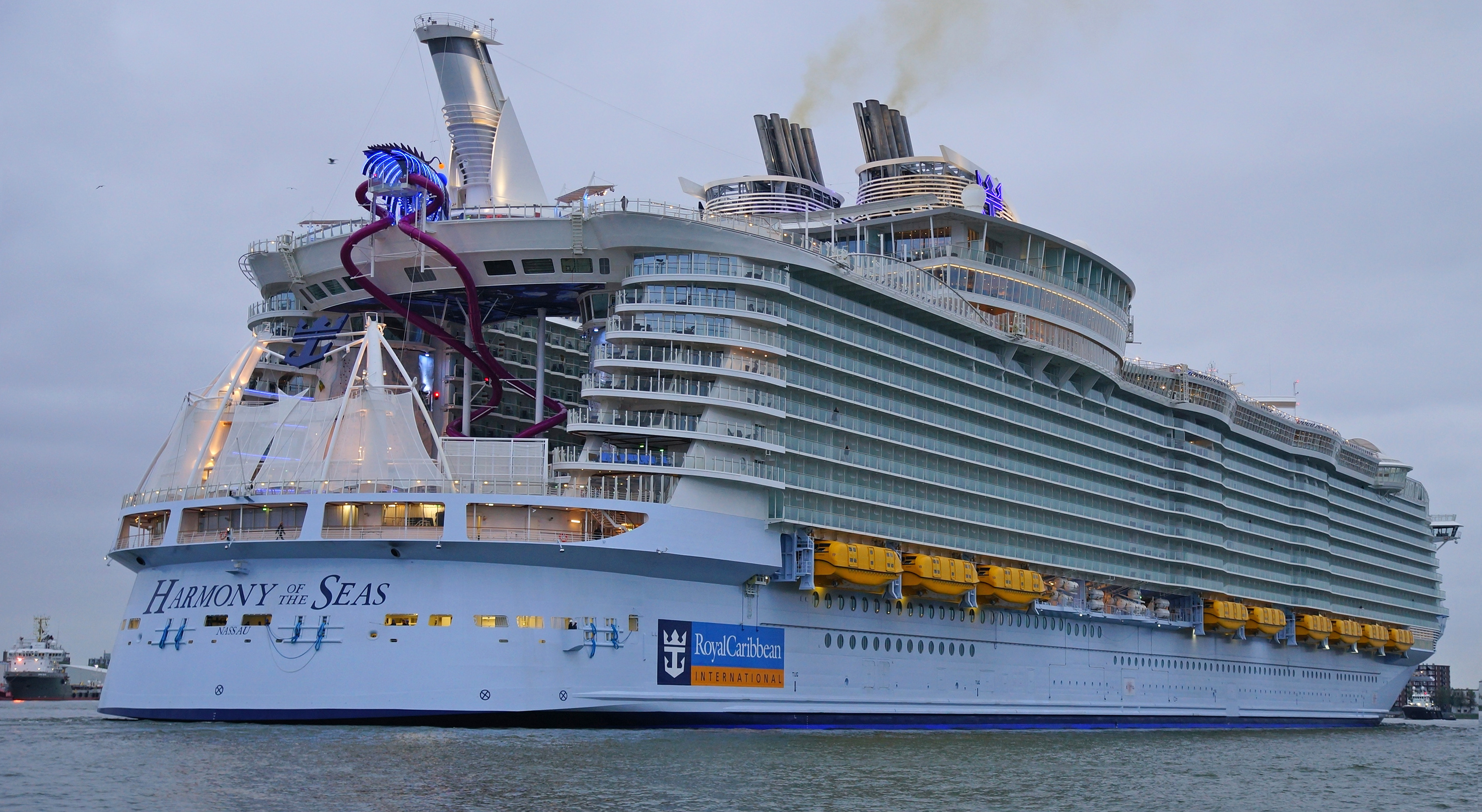
The aft of Harmony of the Seas, with the Aqua Theater and "Ultimate Abyss" slides visible

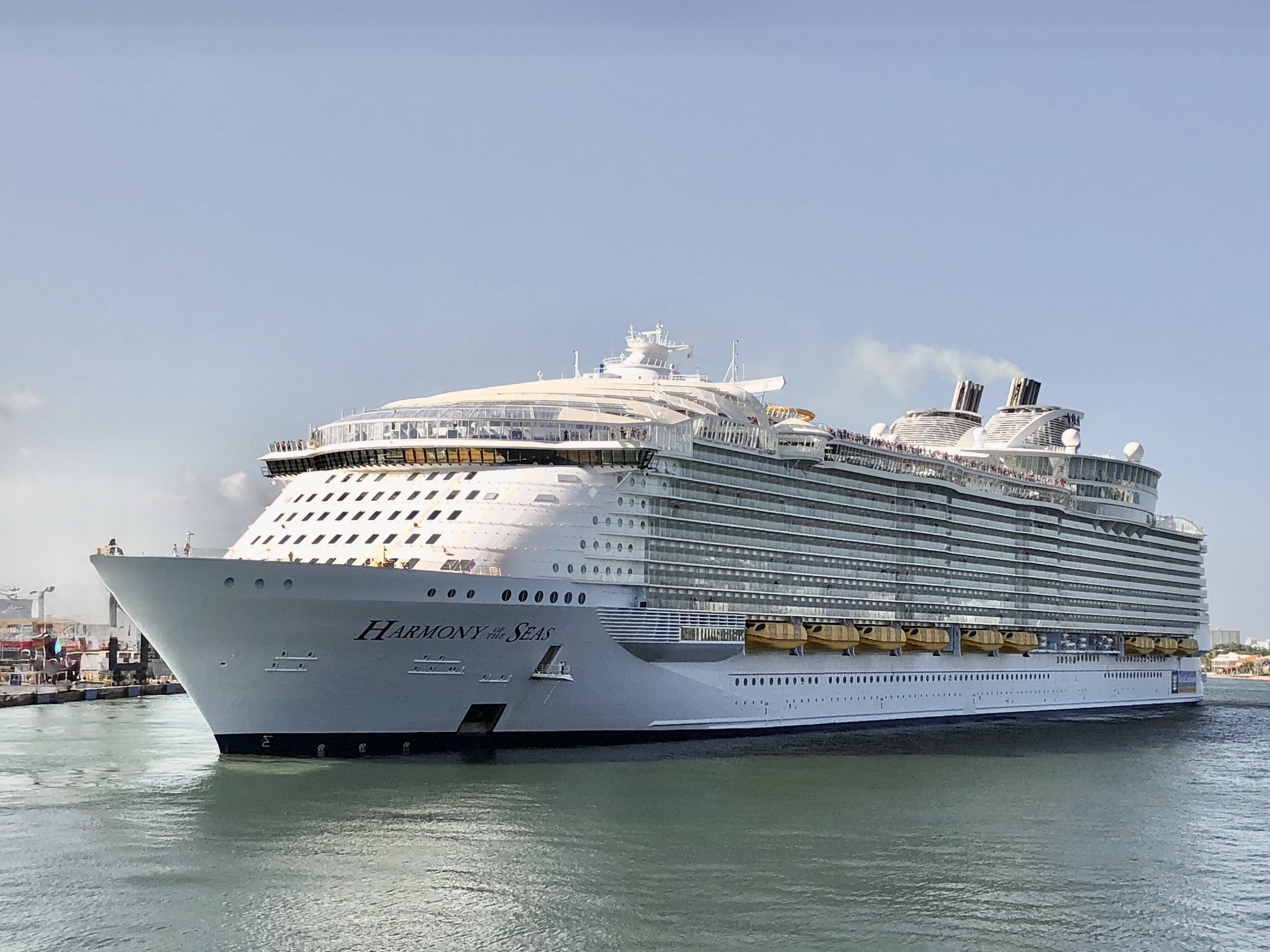
Harmony of the Seas in October 2024
